= Łomża =

- City county
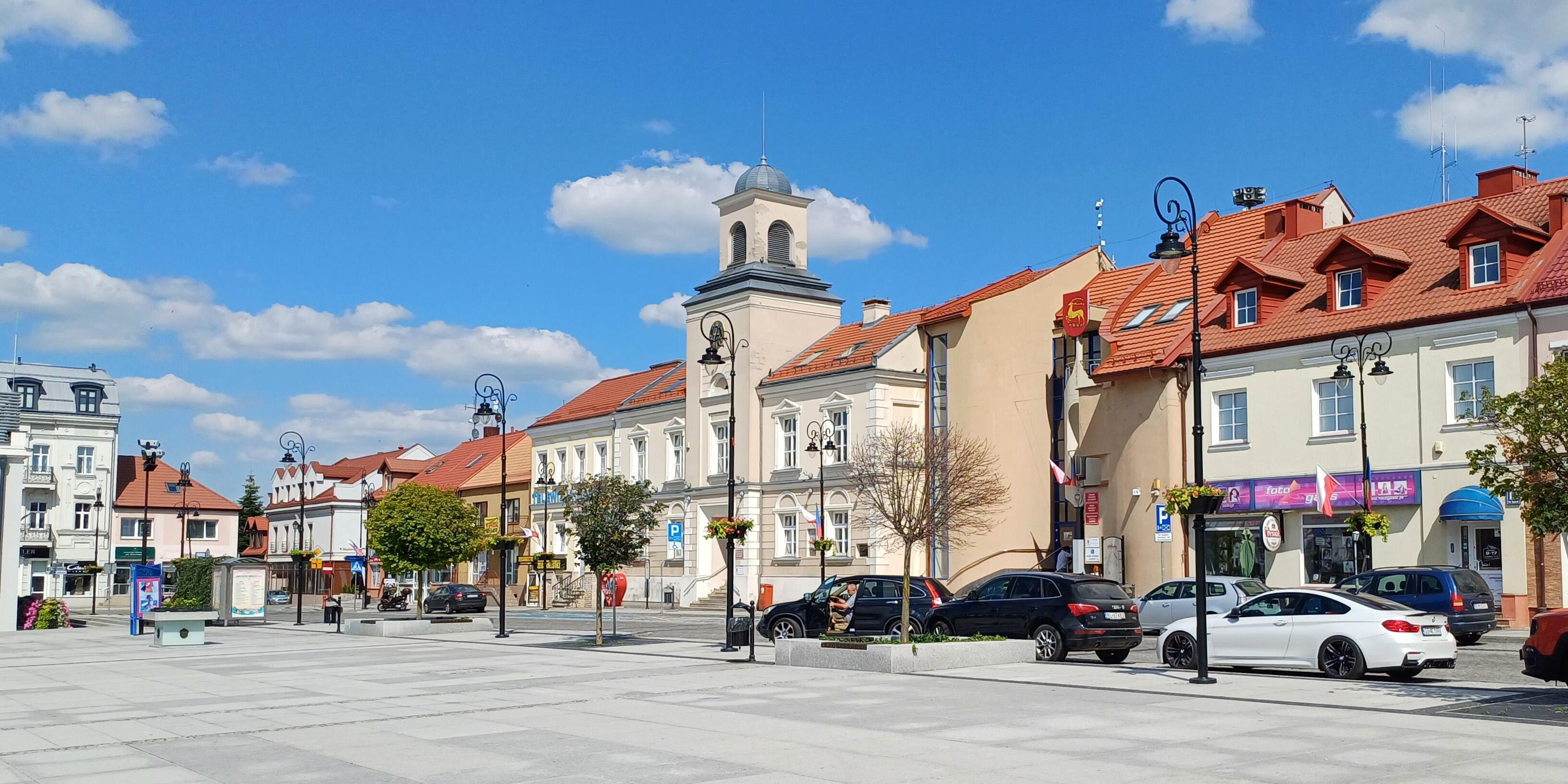
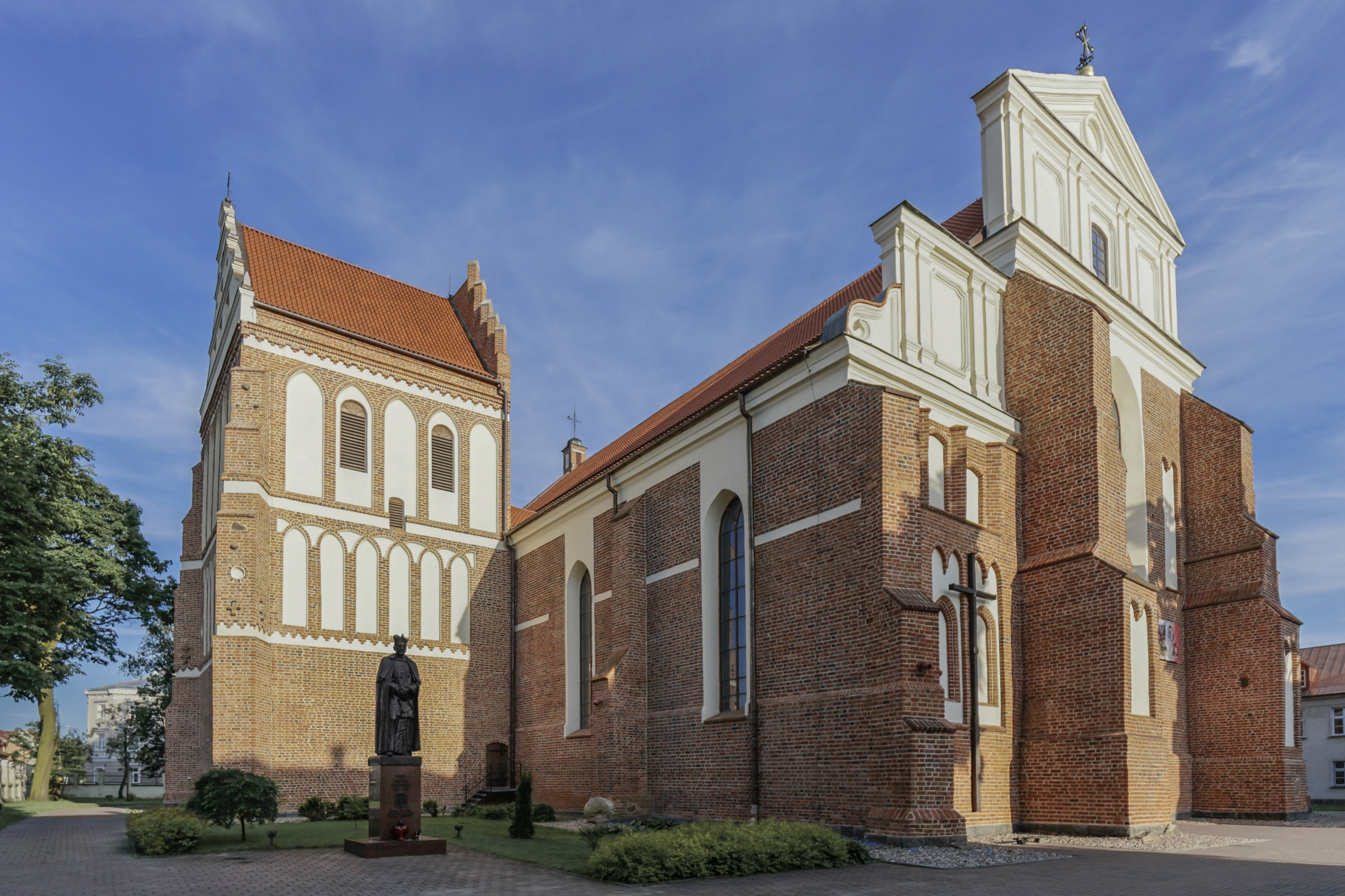
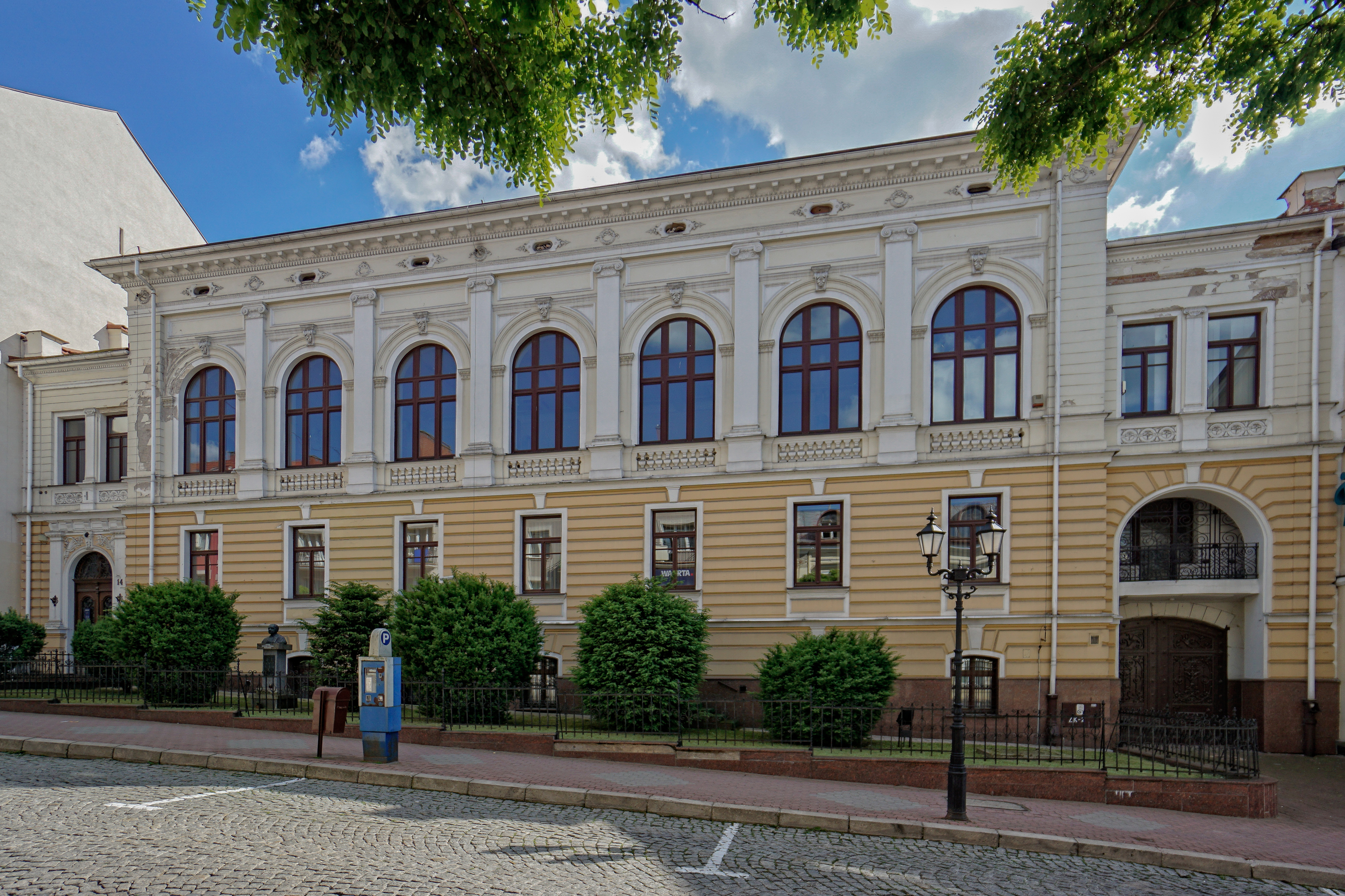
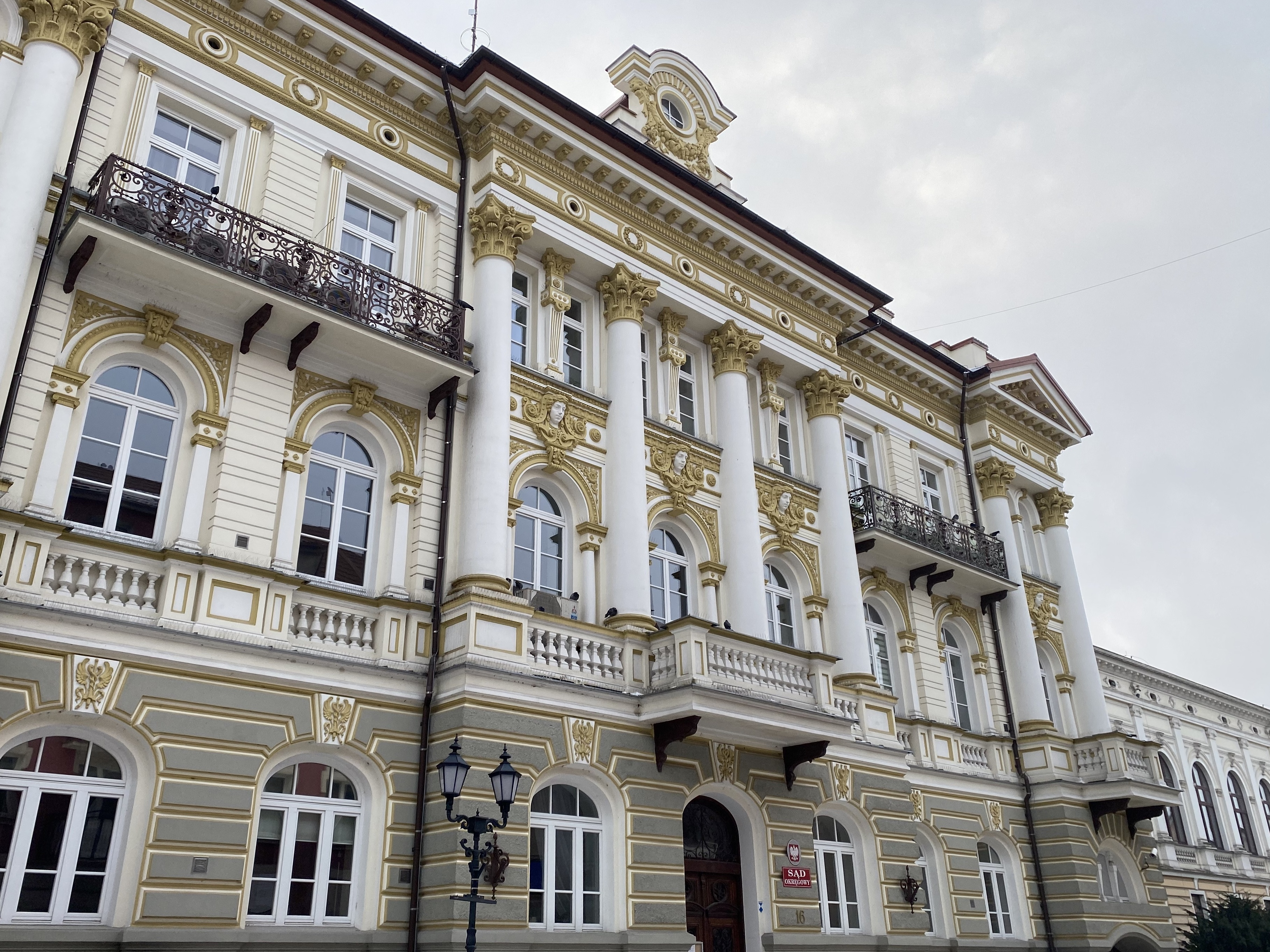
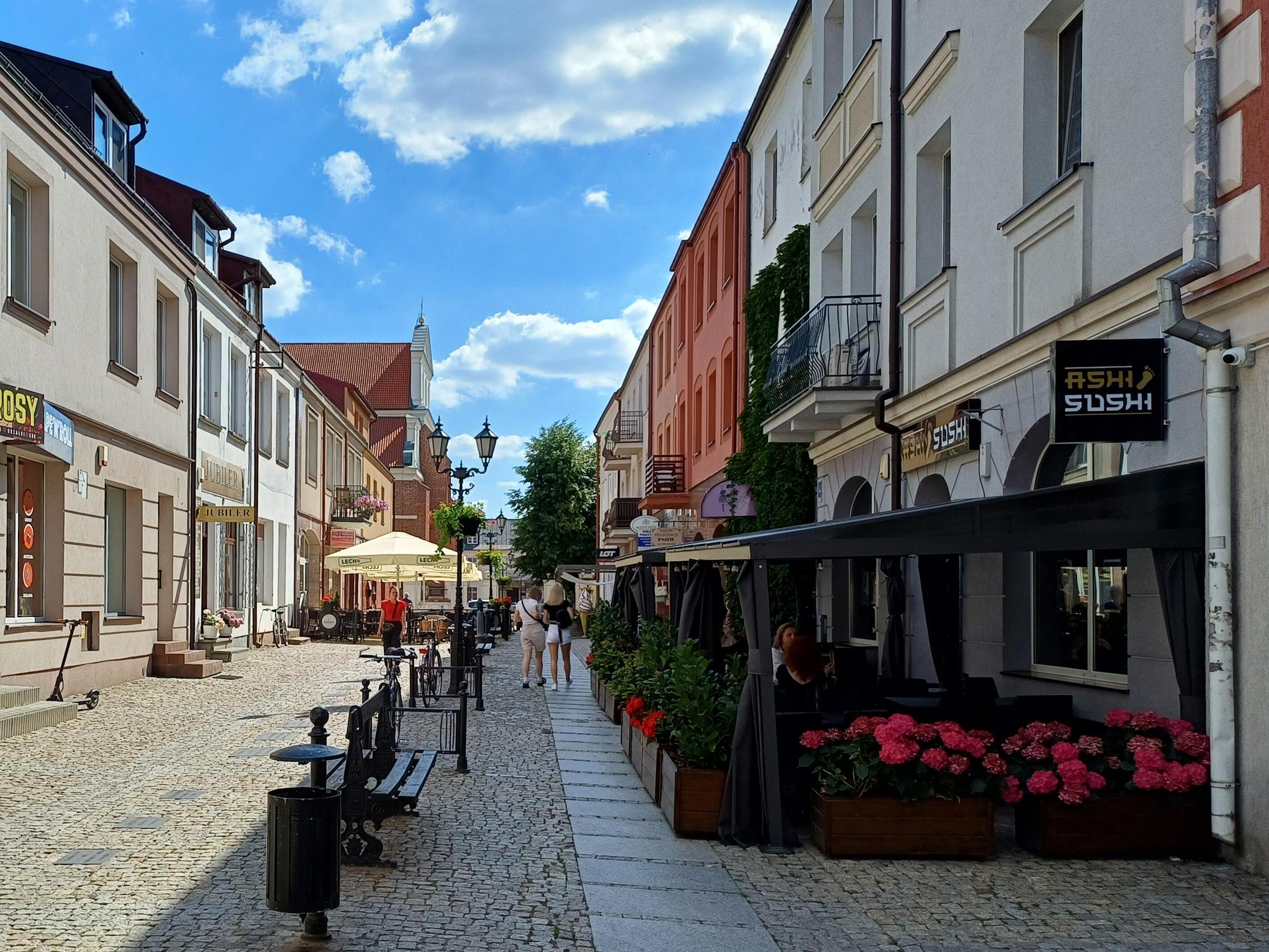
- Town Hall and Old Market Square Cathedral Former State Bank Regional Court Farna Street

- Flag Coat of arms

- Location within Poland
- Coordinates: 53°10′35″N 22°04′23″E
- Country: Poland
- Voivodeship: Podlaskie
- County: city county
- Established: 9th century
- City rights: 1416

Government
  - City mayor: Mariusz Chrzanowski

Area
  - Total: 32.67 km^{2} (12.61 sq mi)
- Elevation: 95 m (312 ft)

Population (31 December 2021)
  - Total: 62,019 ▼
  - Density: 1,898/km^{2} (4,917/sq mi)
- Time zone: UTC+1 (CET)
  - Summer (DST): UTC+2 (CEST)
- Postal code: 18-400 to 18-404
- Area code: +48 86
- Car plates: BL
- Website: www.lomza.pl

Łomża (Polish pronunciation: [ˈwɔmʐa]) is a city in north-eastern Poland, approximately 150 kilometres (93 mi) to the north-east of Warsaw and 80 kilometres (50 mi) west of Białystok. It is situated alongside the Narew River as part of the Podlaskie Voivodeship. It is the capital of Łomża County and has been the seat of the Roman Catholic Diocese of Łomża since 1925.

Łomża is one of the principal economic, educational, and cultural centres of north-eastern Masovia as well as one of the three main cities of Podlaskie Voivodeship (beside Białystok and Suwałki). It lends its name to the protected area of Łomża Landscape Park. The town is also the location of the Łomża Brewery.

== History ==
=== Early history ===
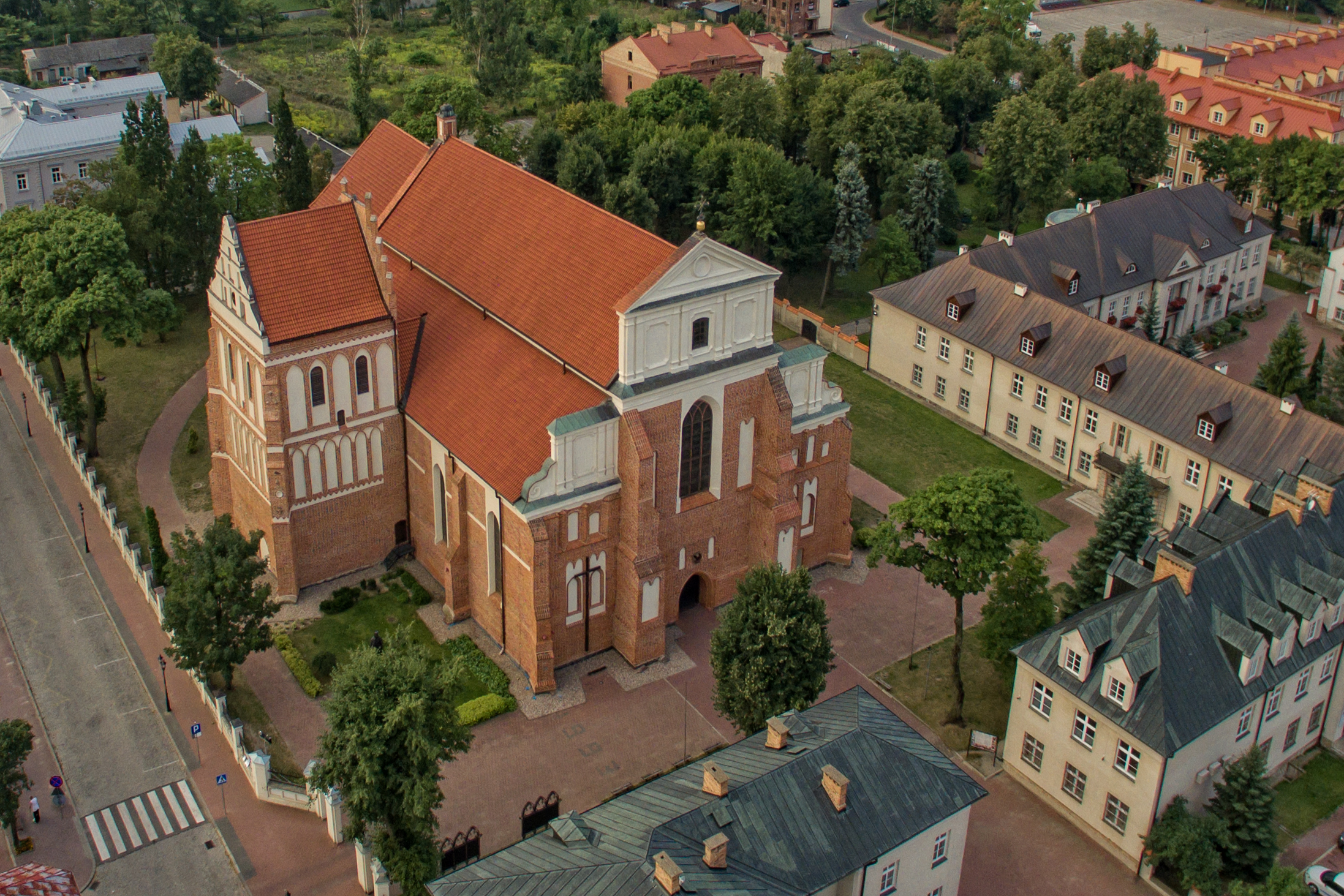
Cathedral of Saint Michael the Archangel

Łomża was founded in the 10th century, on the site of the present day village called Stara Łomża (Old Łomża). It was first mentioned in official records in the 14th century. Łomża received its municipal rights in 1416, and became an important political and economic center in the mid-16th century. Łomża was a royal city of Poland and the capital of the Łomża Land, an administrative unit (ziemia) of the Masovian Voivodeship in the Greater Poland Province until Poland lost its independence in 1795.

Polish Duke Bolesław IV the Curly built a palace there in the 12th century. In 1444 the town was granted an exemption from the transit tax on Narew River contributing to its further development. In the 16th century King Sigismund II Augustus gave Łomża the right to hold great fairs three times a year, similar to Warsaw and Płock. In 1614 the Jesuits founded a Jesuit College, which as today's I Liceum Ogólnokształcące is among the oldest high schools in Poland. In 1618 a great fire destroyed most of the city, and six years later, an epidemic killed 5,021 persons decimating its population. A series of disasters (including the Swedish invasion and the Cossack raids) resulted in its rapid decline. The 3rd Polish National Cavalry Brigade was stationed in Łomża before the Third Partition of Poland.

=== Late modern period ===
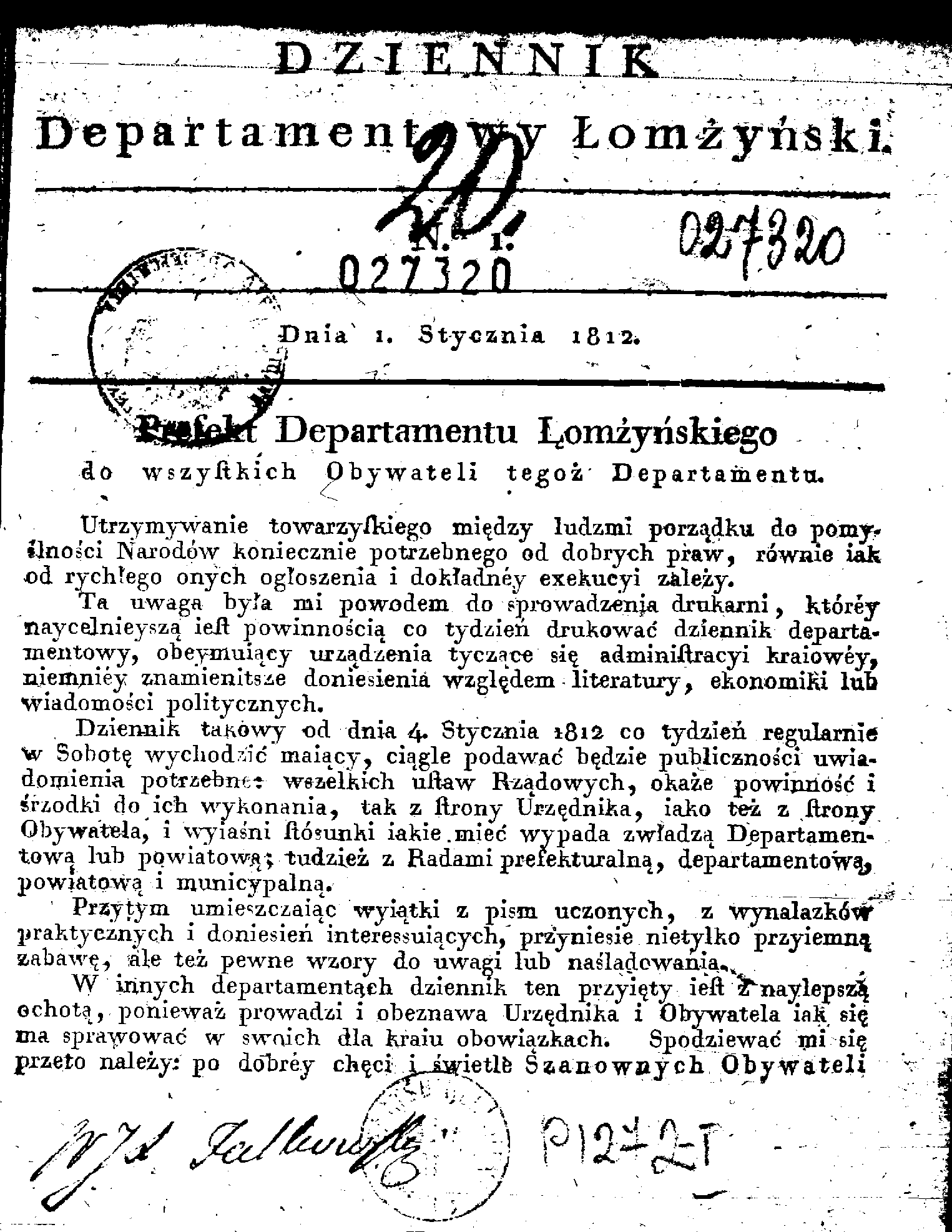
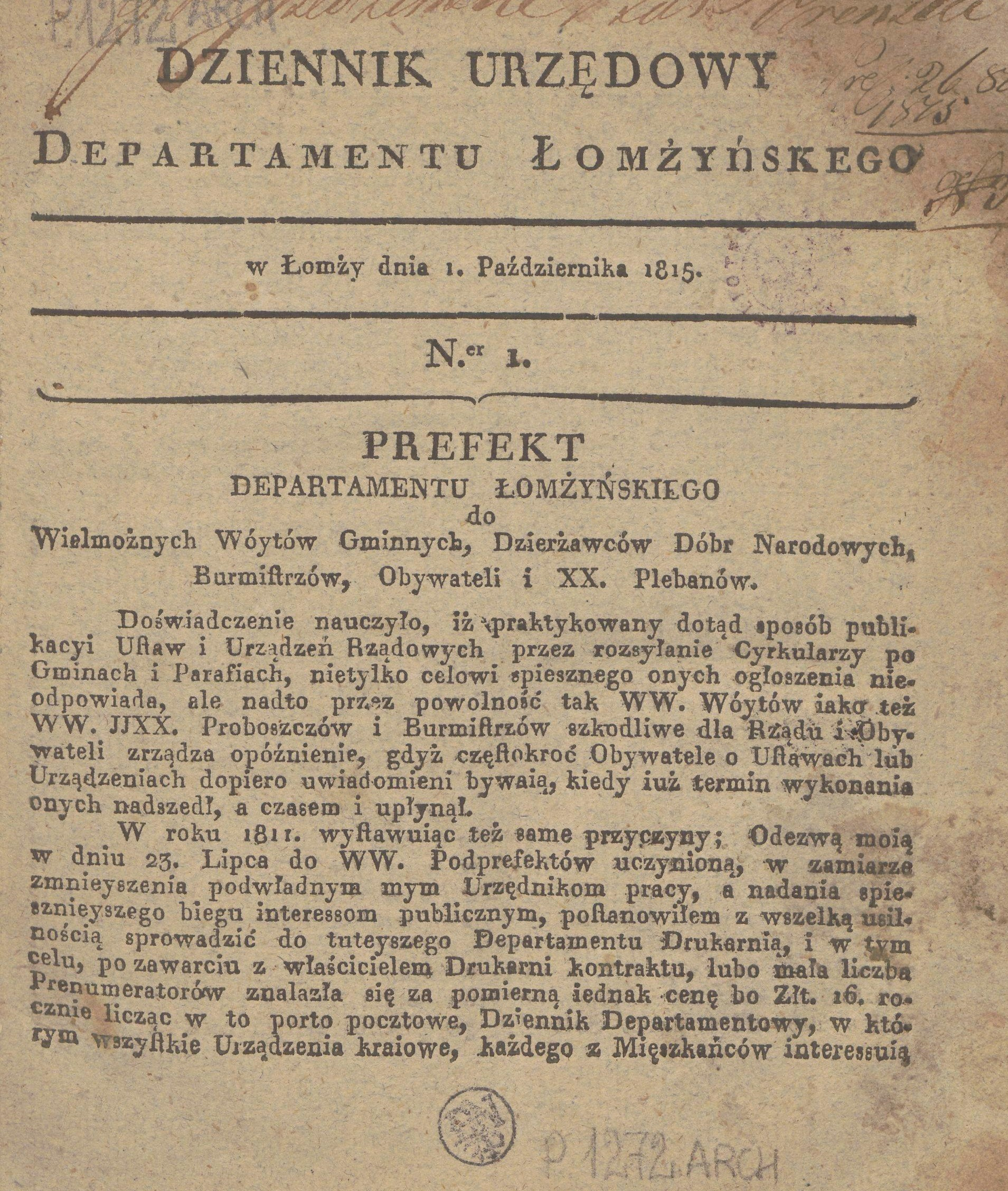
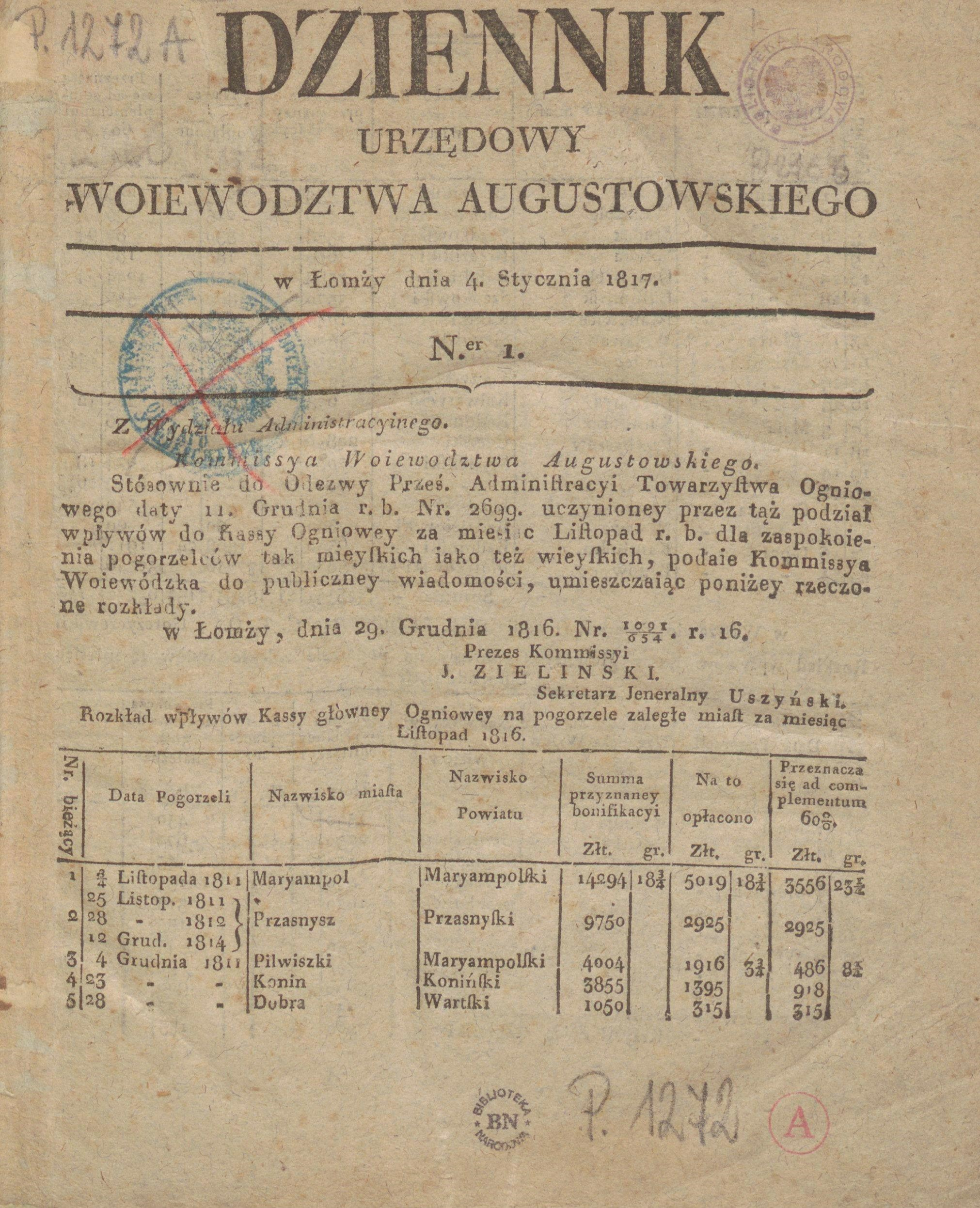
First issues of regional gazettes published in Łomża in 1812, 1815, and 1817

As a result of the Partitions of Poland Łomża was annexed by Prussia in 1795. In 1807 it was included in the short-lived Polish Duchy of Warsaw, within which it was the seat of the Łomża Department. In 1815 Łomża became part of Congress Poland, which was forcibly integrated into the Russian Empire over the course of the 19th century.

After the Russian massacres of Polish protesters in Warsaw in 1861, Polish demonstrations took place in Łomża, at which even romantic poet Władysław Syrokomla gave a public speech, however, they ended in October 1861 when the Russians imposed martial law. Afterwards the Polish resistance began preparations for an uprising. In 1863 the January Uprising broke out and many local Poles joined it. In July 1863, the Russians carried out a massacre of 50 unarmed young Poles in the nearby forest in Wygoda, mainly students of local schools, who joined the uprising. The victims were tortured and murdered in gruesome ways: some had their eyes gouged out, bones broken, or insides torn out before they died. On 15 October a Russian imperial decree declared that it had annexed the Districts of Łomża and Augustów and that they would henceforth be incorporated provinces of the Russian Empire. From November 1863, the Russians carried out mass arrests and confiscations of Polish property, and many insurgents escaped from the country. Russians deported hundreds of Poles from the county to Katorga to Siberia, and Łomża was one of the sites of Russian executions of Polish insurgents. At the place of the executions, Poles put up crosses several times, and the Russians removed them.

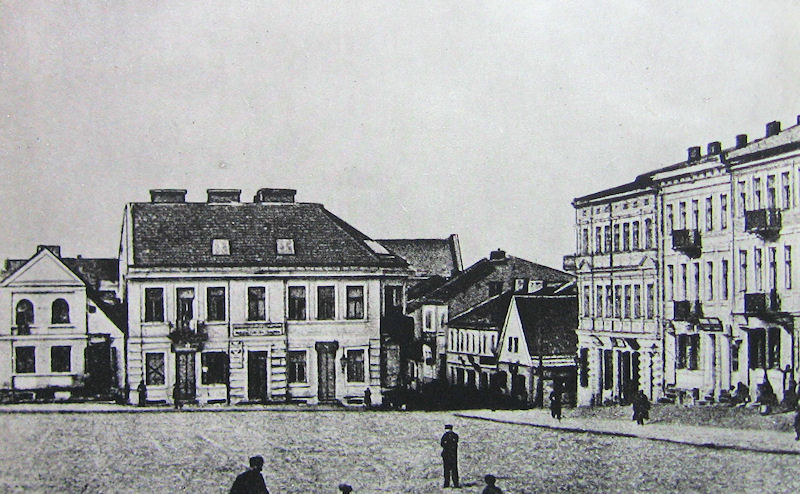
Stary Rynek (Old Market Square) in 1912

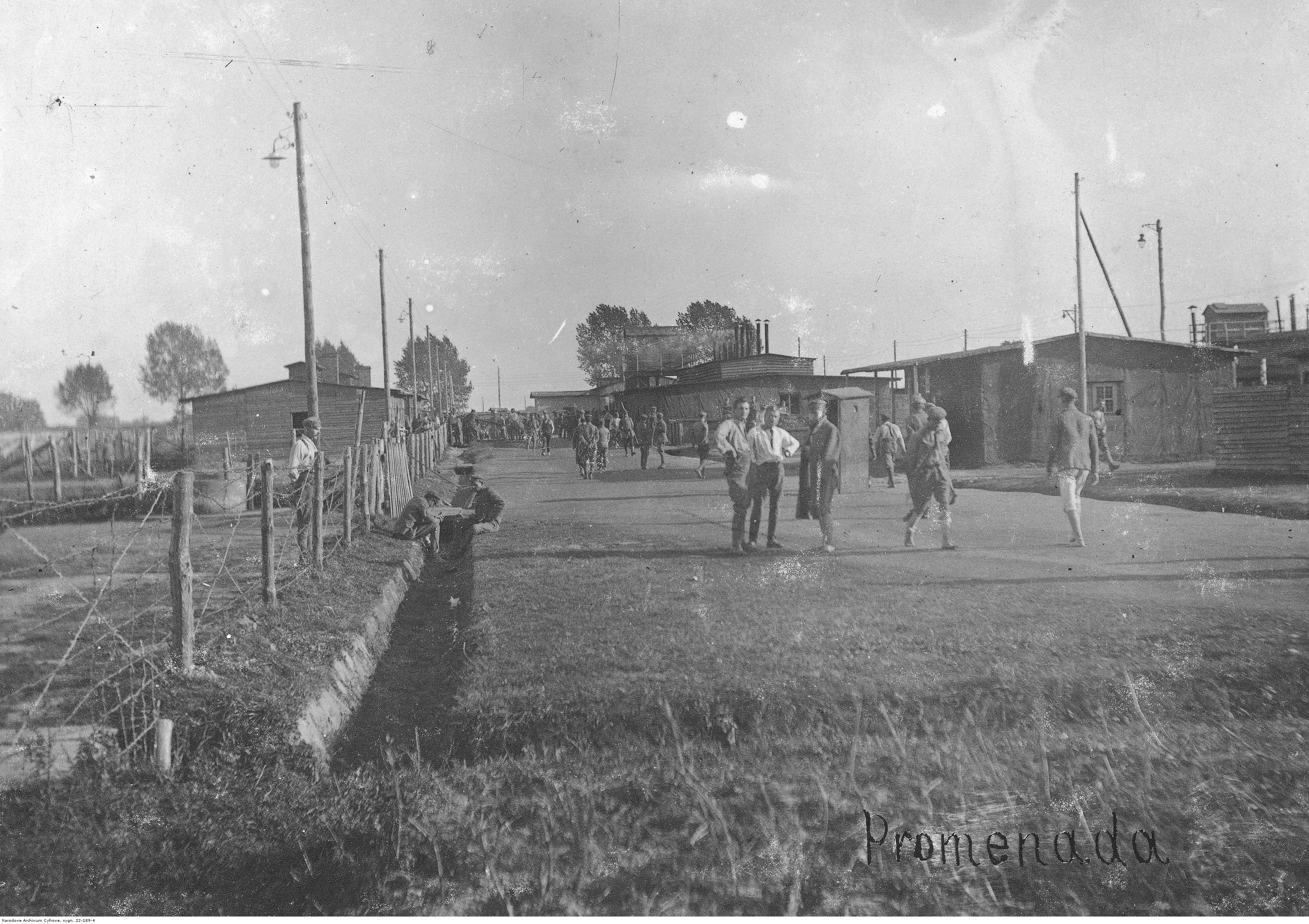
World War I internment camp for Poles

During World War I, the Russian administration was evacuated in June 1915, and the city was occupied by Germany from August 1915 until 1918. Łomża had a local branch of the secret Polish Military Organization, which was also joined by local scouts who carried out intelligence and sabotage operations against the German occupiers. In 1916 the Poles finally erected a still preserved monument at the site of the Russian executions of Polish insurgents. In 1916–1917, the Polish Legions were stationed in the city. In 1917–1918, Łomża was the location of a German internment camp for soldiers of the Polish Legions. The Polish resistance movement organized food aid and assisted in the escape of interned Polish legionnaires from the camp. In 1917, the commander of the local unit of the Polish Military Organization, was arrested. In November 1918, Poland regained independence, and the occupying German forces opened fire on Poles who tried to liberate the city, but it was still reintegrated with the reborn Polish state.

During the Polish-Soviet War of 1919–1921, the city was attacked by the Russians on 29 July 1920. On 4 August the Russian military took Łomża. Polish forces defended the city until 15 August, when Polish Fourth Army of General Leonard Skierski attacked the 15th Army, led by Soviet General August Kork. The Polish army successfully took back control of Łomża from Russian forces. The Russian army retreated eastward under pressure from the Polish forces.

=== World War II ===
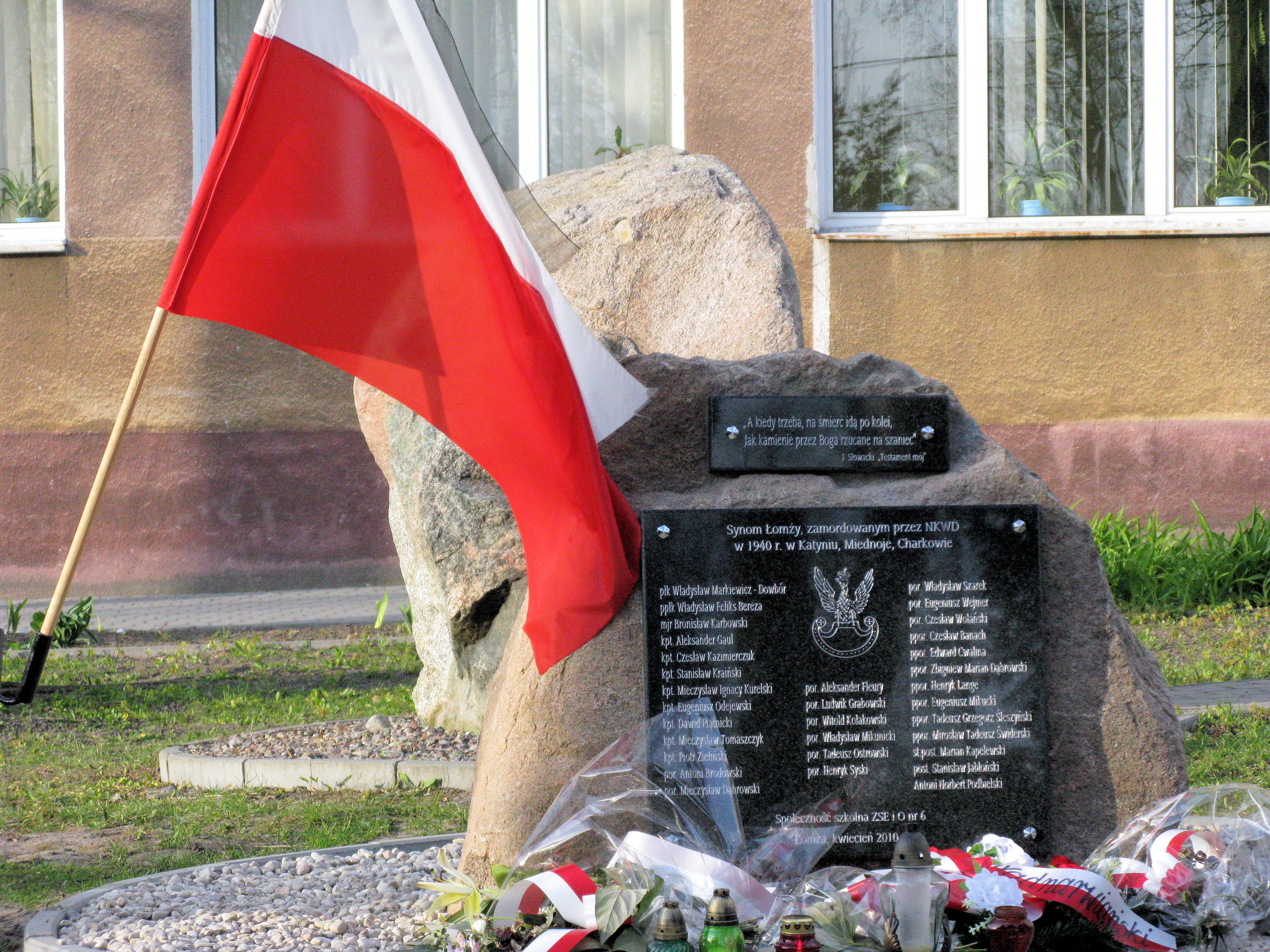
Memorial to Poles from Łomża murdered in the Katyn massacre

In September 1939, during the joint Soviet and German invasion of Poland, Łomża was largely destroyed by the Wehrmacht during the Battle of Łomża, and then was briefly occupied by Germany. The Einsatzgruppe V entered Łomża in mid-September to commit various crimes against Poles. Germans carried out searches of Polish offices, organizations, and Catholic institutions, including the bishop's seat and the Capuchin monastery, and banned preaching and the organization of meetings.

On 26 September 1939 a Soviet aircraft dropped anti-Polish propaganda leaflets, which stated that "Poles are not capable of self-governing their country," so "the Soviets come to take care of them out of mercy." Soon afterwards the city was turned over by the Germans to the Red Army, which entered on 29 September and was incorporated into the Byelorussian SSR. The Soviets established a local station of the NKVD, and the Polish population was subjected to various repressions. In January 1940, the Soviets changed several street names, even calling one 17 September Street, after the day of the Soviet invasion of Poland. At least 32 Poles from Łomża were murdered by the Russians in the Katyn massacre in 1940. The Soviets carried out arrests of the Capuchin monks and expelled Benedictine nuns in mid-1940. According to Soviet data from September 1940, over 330 Polish families were deported from the district to the USSR. The Soviets held 2,128 people in the local prison as of 21 June 1941, the day before Germany invaded the Soviet Union, and on 20–21 June they carried out mass deportations of Poles to Russia. Łomża remained under Soviet control until Operation Barbarossa.

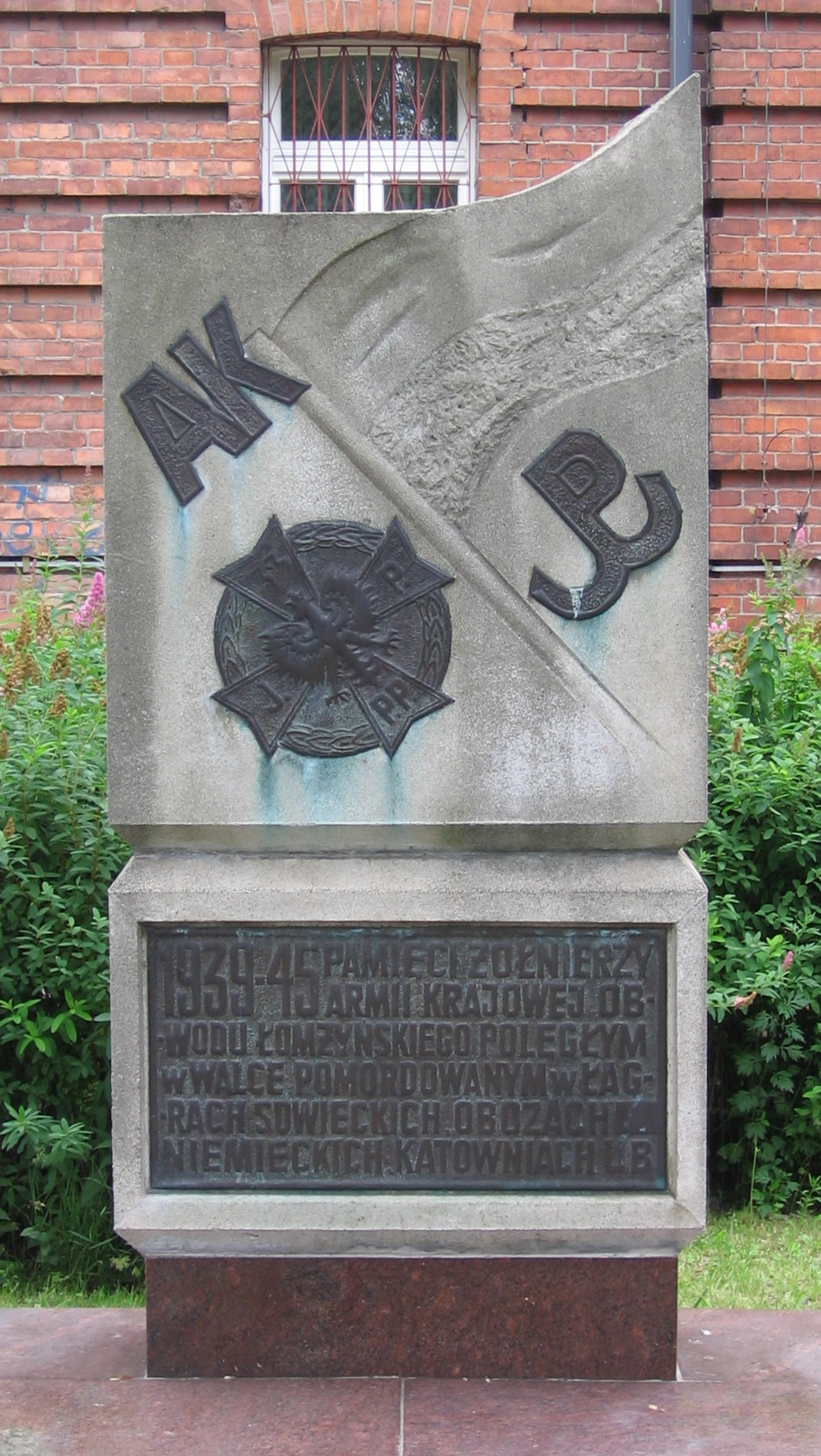
Monument to local fallen and murdered soldiers of the Home Army

In June 1941, at the onset of the Russian campaign Łomża was captured by the Wehrmacht and used as a communications hub by the German forces. Hundreds of Poles, including those initially held in the local prison and local Polish intelligentsia, were murdered in large massacres in nearby villages of Sławiec, Jeziorko and Pniewo in 1942–1943. The Jewish population of Łomża, which numbered 9,000 at the beginning of the war, was almost entirely wiped out, murdered at a nearby forest or sent to the Auschwitz concentration camp to be murdered there. Only a few dozen survived. Since 1943, the Sicherheitspolizei carried out deportations of Poles including teenage boys from the local prison to the Stutthof concentration camp.

The Polish underground resistance movement organized secret education, military training, medical courses, published Polish underground press, organized aid for Polish prisoners of war, and conducted guerrilla warfare. Even teenagers participated in the resistance. Several resistance members were arrested by the Soviets. In 1941 the local resistance was weakened when the Soviets arrested its commander.

The Red Army fought back and successfully captured Łomża on 13 September 1944. Afterwards the city was restored to Poland, although with a Soviet-installed communist regime, which remained in power until the Fall of Communism in the 1980s.

=== Recent period ===
On 21 May 1945, the Polish anti-communist resistance broke into the communist prison in Łomża. In the following years, the resistance remained active in Łomża, including the local organizations Bracia Atomów, Polska Armia Powstańcza (Polish Insurgent Army) and Młodzi Patrioci Polscy (Young Polish Patriots), which engaged in educational and sabotage activities.

Between 1946 and 1975, the oldest part of the city was rebuilt. New housing estates came into existence along with several industrial plants, among them Łomża cotton and furniture factories and starch manufacturer PEPEES, as well as municipal thermal power station. The city transit system was also established during this time. By the beginning of the 1970s, the population had reached almost 30,000 inhabitants. It was the capital of the Łomża Voivodeship from 1975 to 1998.

== Jewish community ==
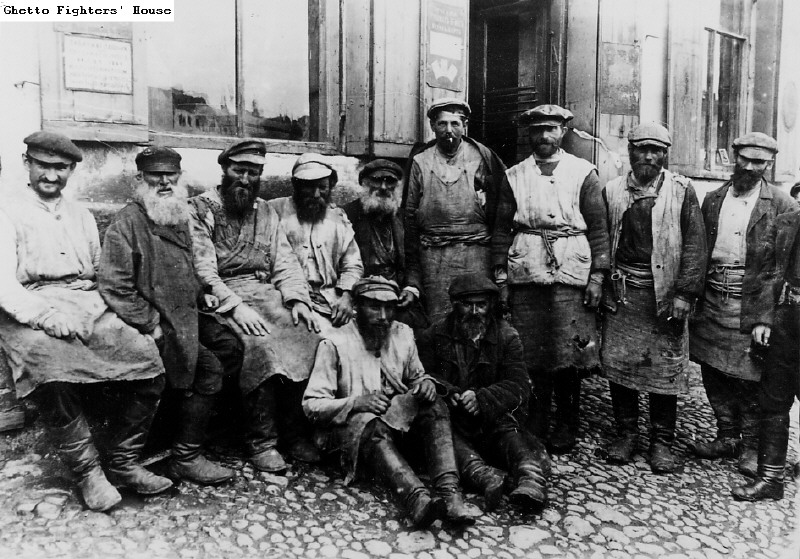
Jewish porters in Łomża, c.1914

References to Jewish residents in Łomża (Yiddish: לאמזשע, romanized: Lomzhe) date to 1494. The population numbers date back only to 1808, when 157 Jews were officially counted. They settled in the village of Rybaki along the Narew River, which would become the Łomża shtetl.

A magnificent stone synagogue was built there in 1881 on the initiative of Rabbi Eliezer-Simcha Rabinowicz. The Great Synagogue designed by Enrico Marconi became a centre of the Zionist movement. The Lomza Yeshiva attracted hundreds of Orthodox Jewish students, founded in 1883.

World War I was especially hard on the Jewish community of Łomża, which was a major battle area against German military forces. In 1915, the Jewish Aid Society estimated that 22,000 Jewish residents of Łomża were made homeless from the war. In 1931, there were 8,912 Jews who lived in the city.

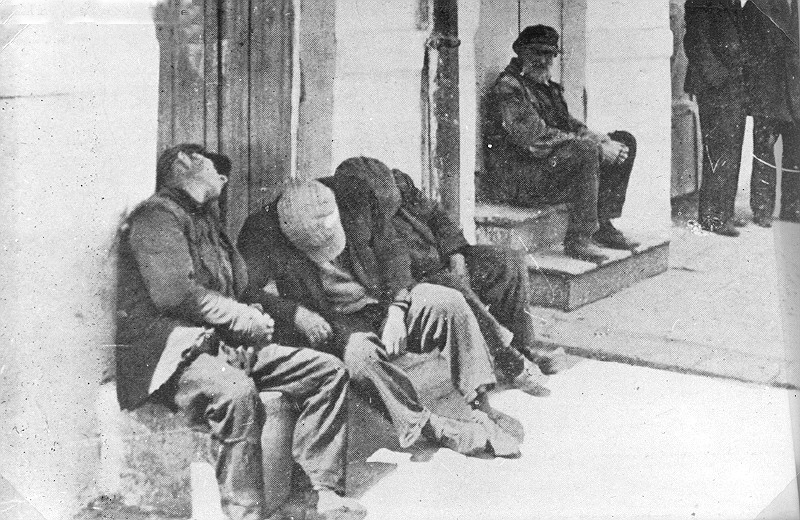
Jews sitting outside their apartments in the Łomża ghetto

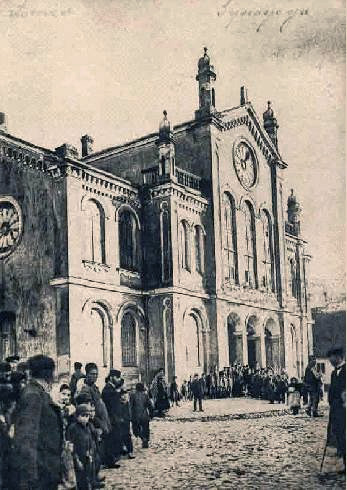
Great Synagogue of Łomża before destruction by the German Nazis in 1941

On 12 August 1941, a Łomża Ghetto was created in the vicinity of the Old Market Square (Stary Rynek). On 29 October 1941 German troops forced over 1,000 Jewish residents of Łomża to kneel in trenches, and they murdered them all with machine guns. They continued murdering entire families. The Nazi Einsatzkommando under SS-Obersturmführer Hermann Schaper committed mass killings of alleged Soviet collaborators a few days later. The number of Jews herded into the Łomża Ghetto from surrounding villages and towns including Jedwabne, Stawiski, Piątnica, Rotki, Wizna, Łomża, and others, ranged from 10,000 to 18,000. Over two-thousand people were murdered in the Giełczyn Forest outside of town. Many Jews perished from malnutrition and diseases such as dysentery and typhus. The rest were shipped to Auschwitz. The Łomża synagogue was destroyed. The ghetto was liquidated in the final deportation action on 1 November 1942. Only a small number of the Jews of Łomża survived the Holocaust; some found refuge with Catholic Polish families.

At the end of 1944, the Red Army recaptured the territory. Following the Yalta Conference, the Soviets ceded the city to Poland, with its total population reduced to 12,500 inhabitants, none of whom were Jewish.

One of the only visible remnants of the city's Jewish history is the Jewish cemetery. In 1999, the Łomża Jewish Cemetery Foundation was officially founded as a charity devoted to restoring the cemetery, showing respect to the deceased buried there, and to improve relations between Poles and Jews. Łomża declared the Jewish cemetery to be historical sites, and the city erected signed warning that any damage caused would be punishable under the Historical Site Preservation Law. The city also decided to install doors and replace the roof on one of the original cemetery's buildings.

In the 1997, a Torah was discovered that had been hidden in a home in Łomża since World War II. The Torah was discovered while the home was being razed to build new housing. The Torah was bought by Gerald C. Bender, a man living in Illinois in the United States whose father had been born and raised in Łomża. Bender bought the Torah in order to donate it to a synagogue.

== Demographics ==
| Description | Total | Women | % | Men | % |
|---|---|---|---|---|---|
| Population of Łomża | 63,036 | 32,652 | 51.8 | 30,384 | 48.2 |
| Population density (people/km^{2}) | 1,929.5 | 999.4/km^{2} | | 930.0/km^{2} |

Łomża is the third largest city in Podlaskie Voivodeship with 62,019 inhabitants as of 2021.

=== Historical population of Łomża, 1808 – 1931 ===
General population in blue. Number of Poles of Jewish faith in green. Source: Qiryat Tiv'on, Israel.

== Religion ==
The inhabitants of Łomża are predominantly Roman Catholic, although over the centuries in addition to the Catholics, followers of other religions have settled there. There is evidence of many Jewish and Protestant gravestones at the Łomża cemeteries, particularly the two abandoned Jewish cemeteries.

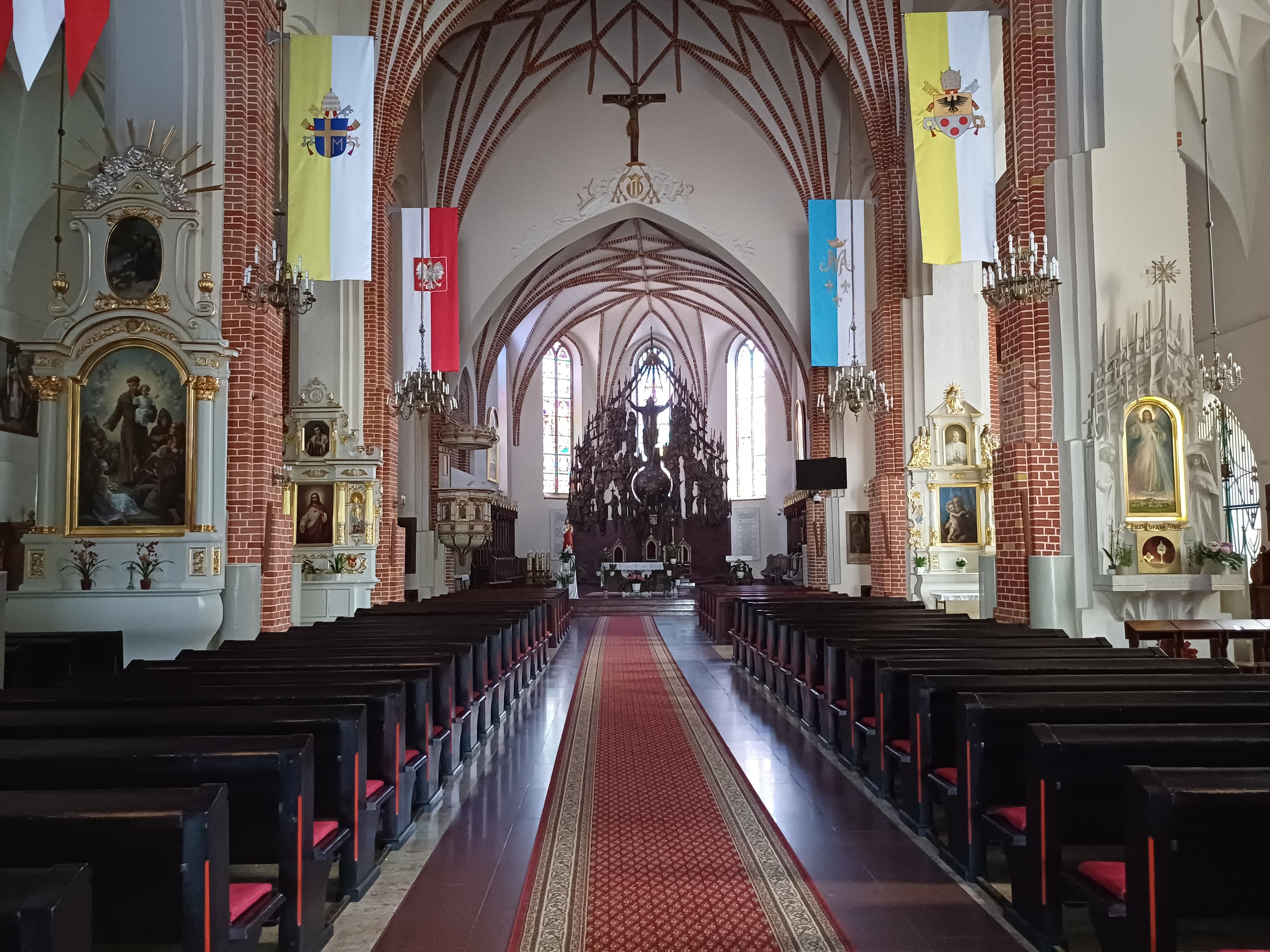
Main nave of the Cathedral of Saint Michael the Archangel

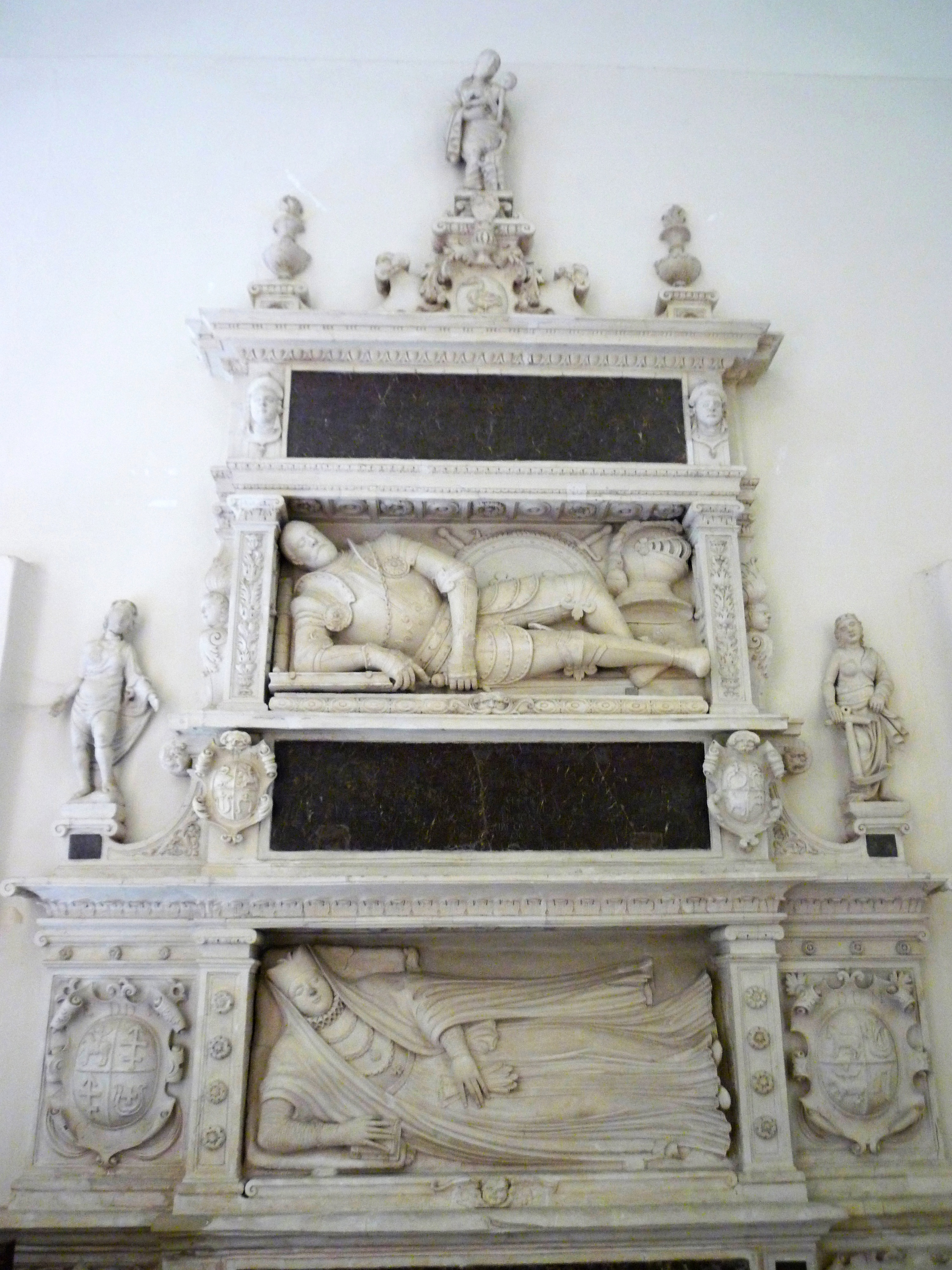
Renaissance tombstone from 1589 in the cathedral

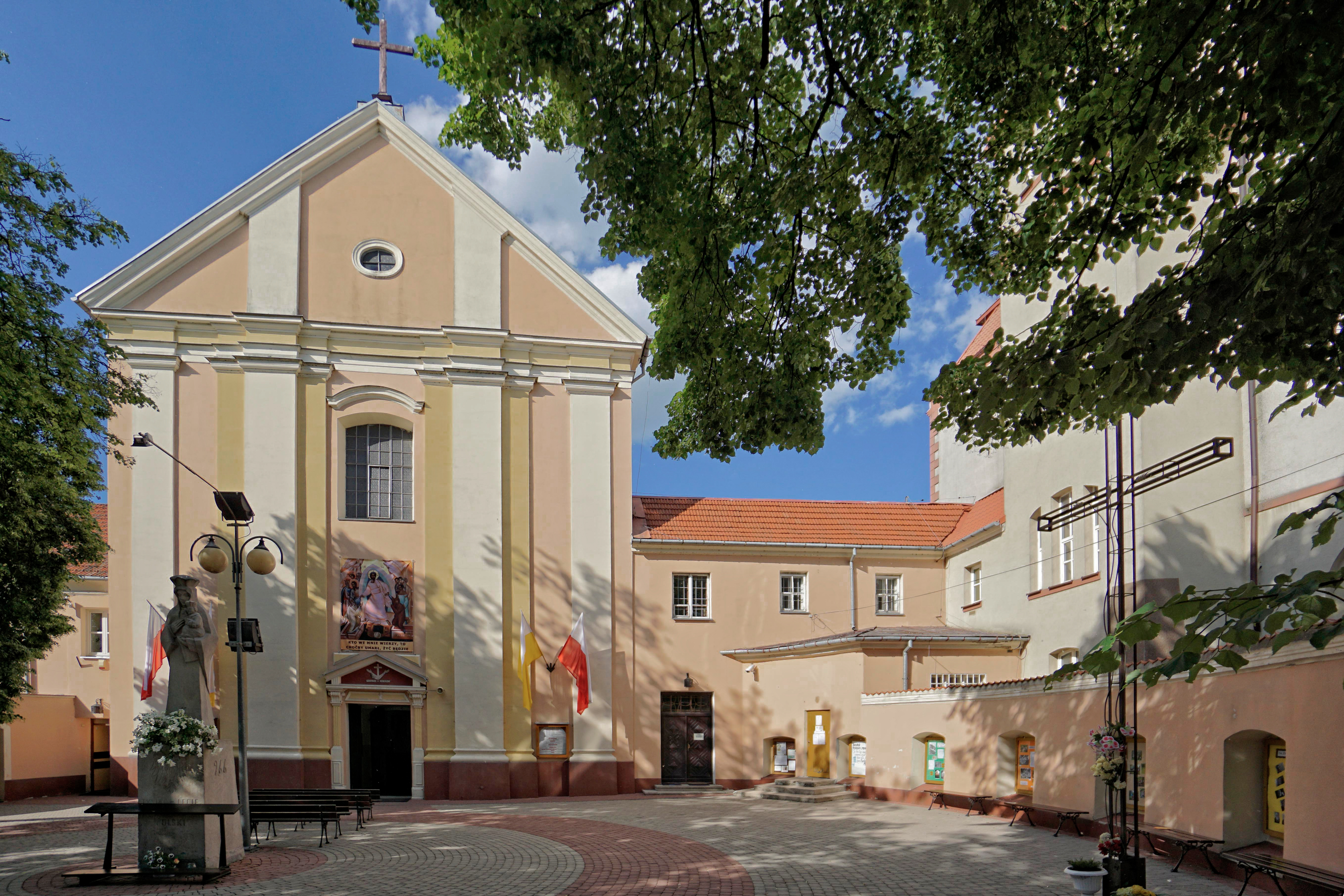
Capuchin parish church (18th century)

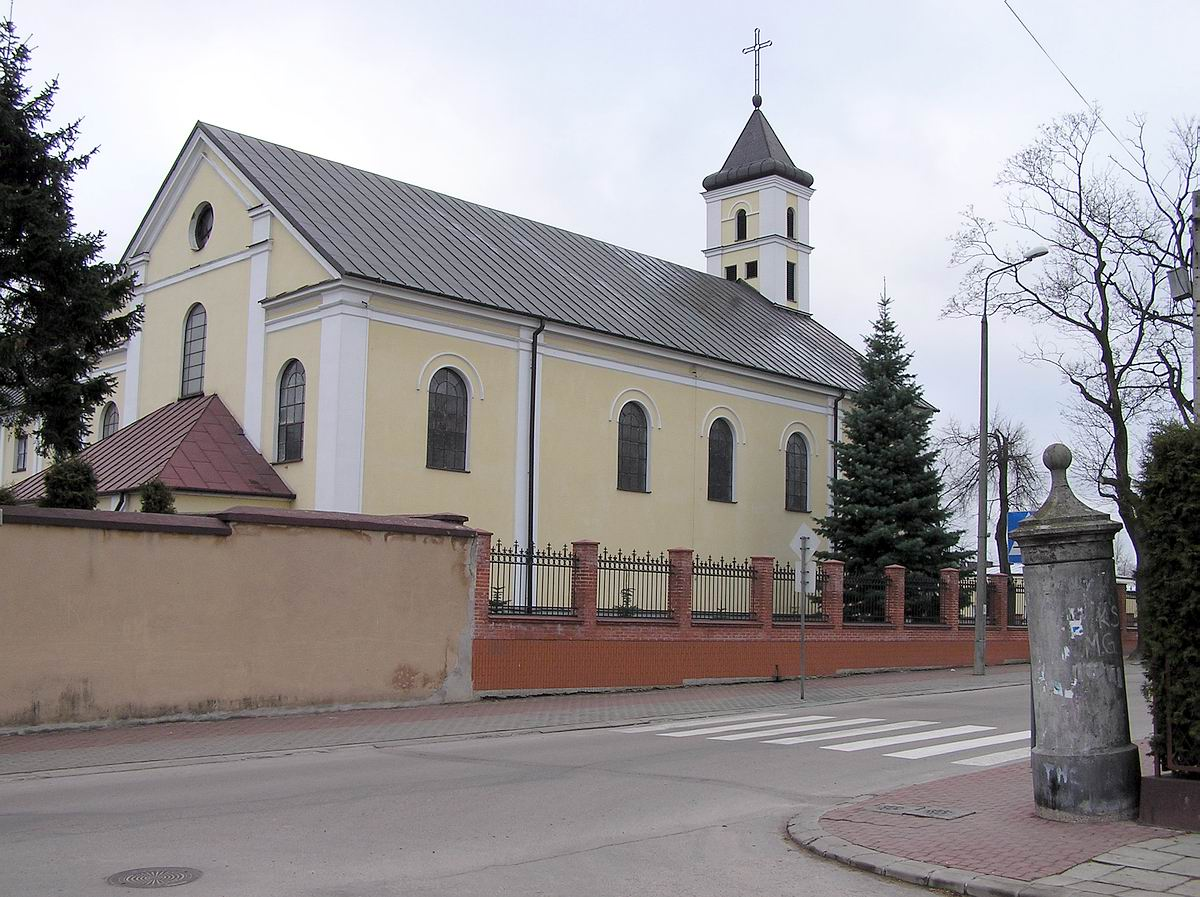
Holy Trinity church (19th century)

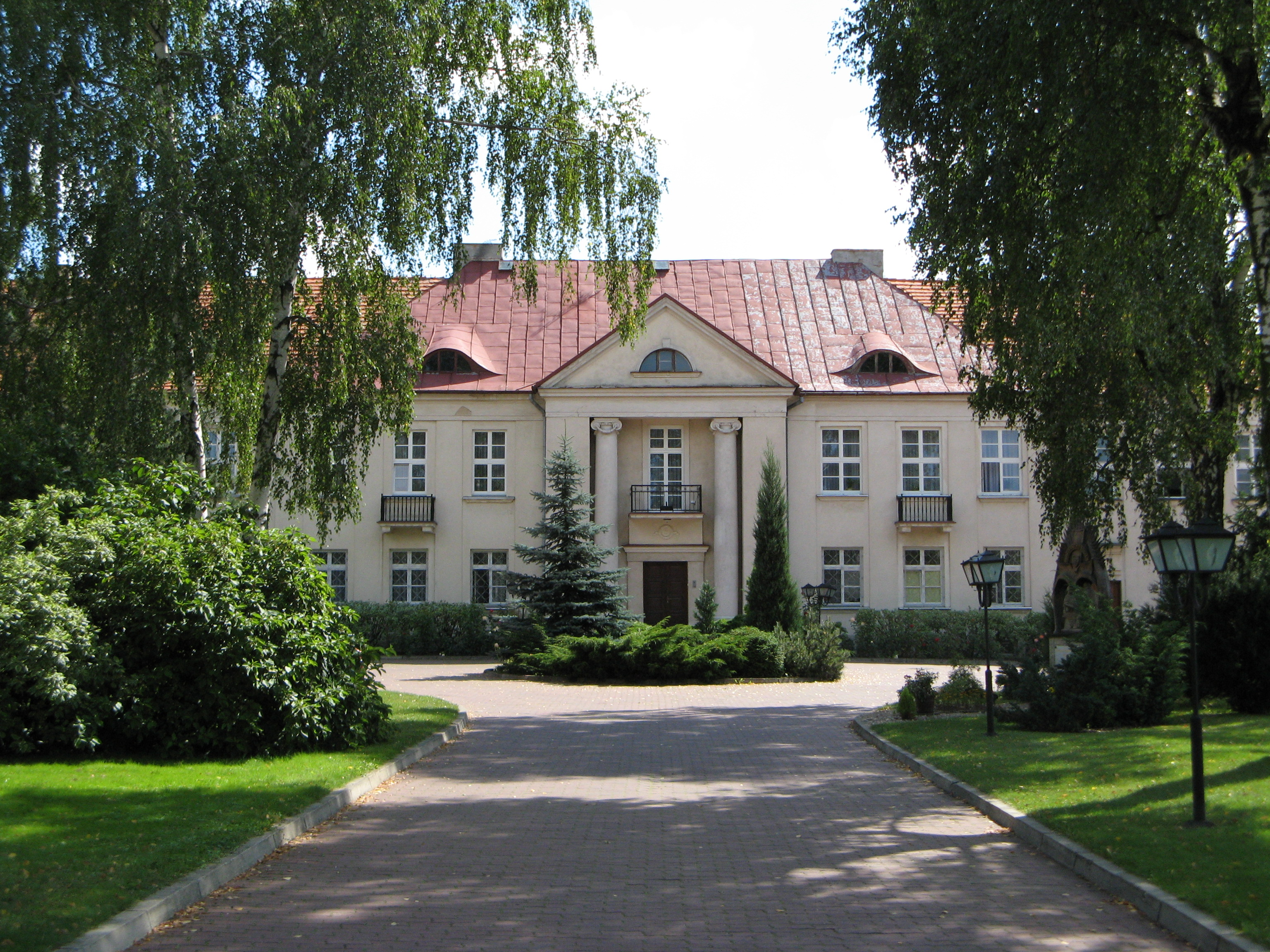
Episcopal Palace

== Education ==
The history of education in Łomża dates back to the early 15th century, when the first parish was founded. In 1614, Jesuits residing in Łomża created a Collegium (present-day I Liceum Ogólnokształcące im. Tadeusza Kościuszki). One of its rectors was Andrew Bobola. The educational level has not decreased after the KEN school pijarom in 1774. Łomża has educated a number of dignitaries, among others: Szymon Konarski, Rafał Krajewski, Jakub Ignacy Weight, Wojciech Szweykowski, and Adam Chętnik.

Currently in Łomża there is a well-developed network of public and private schools at all levels. There are seven primary schools, eight schools, ten secondary schools, six universities (including three non-public) and two schools of art. The educational level in Łomża is high, based on the results of the exams and countrywide lists. For example, I Liceum Ogólnokształcące rates as a top national and central Poland school.

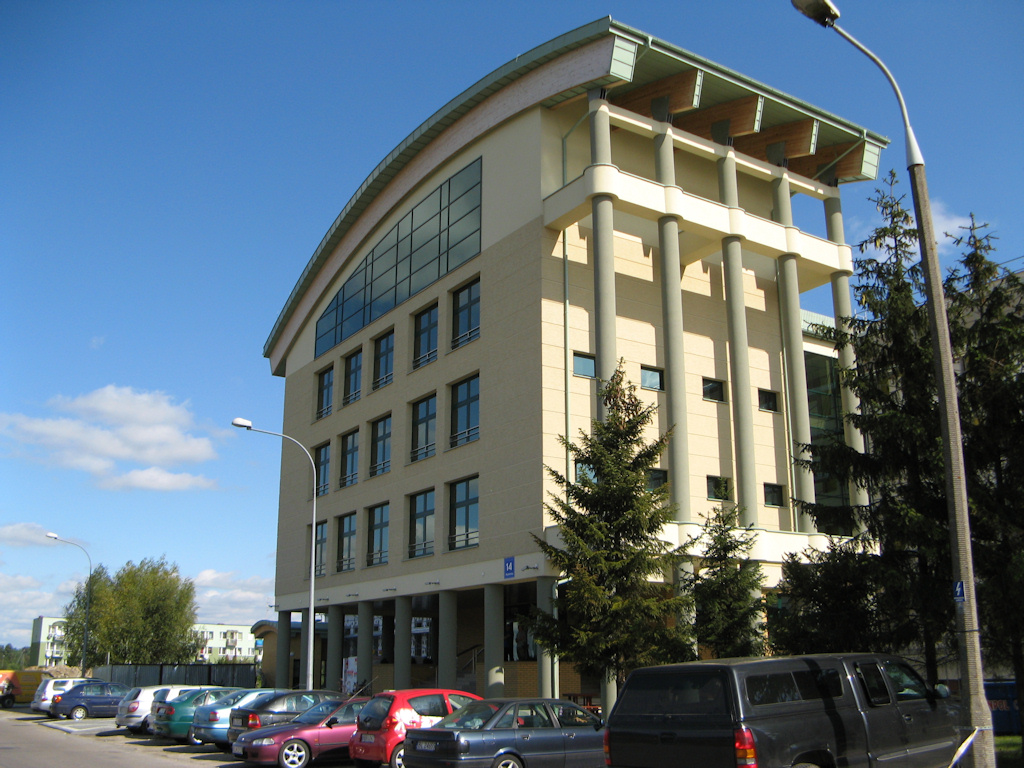
College of Computer Science and Business Administration in Łomża.

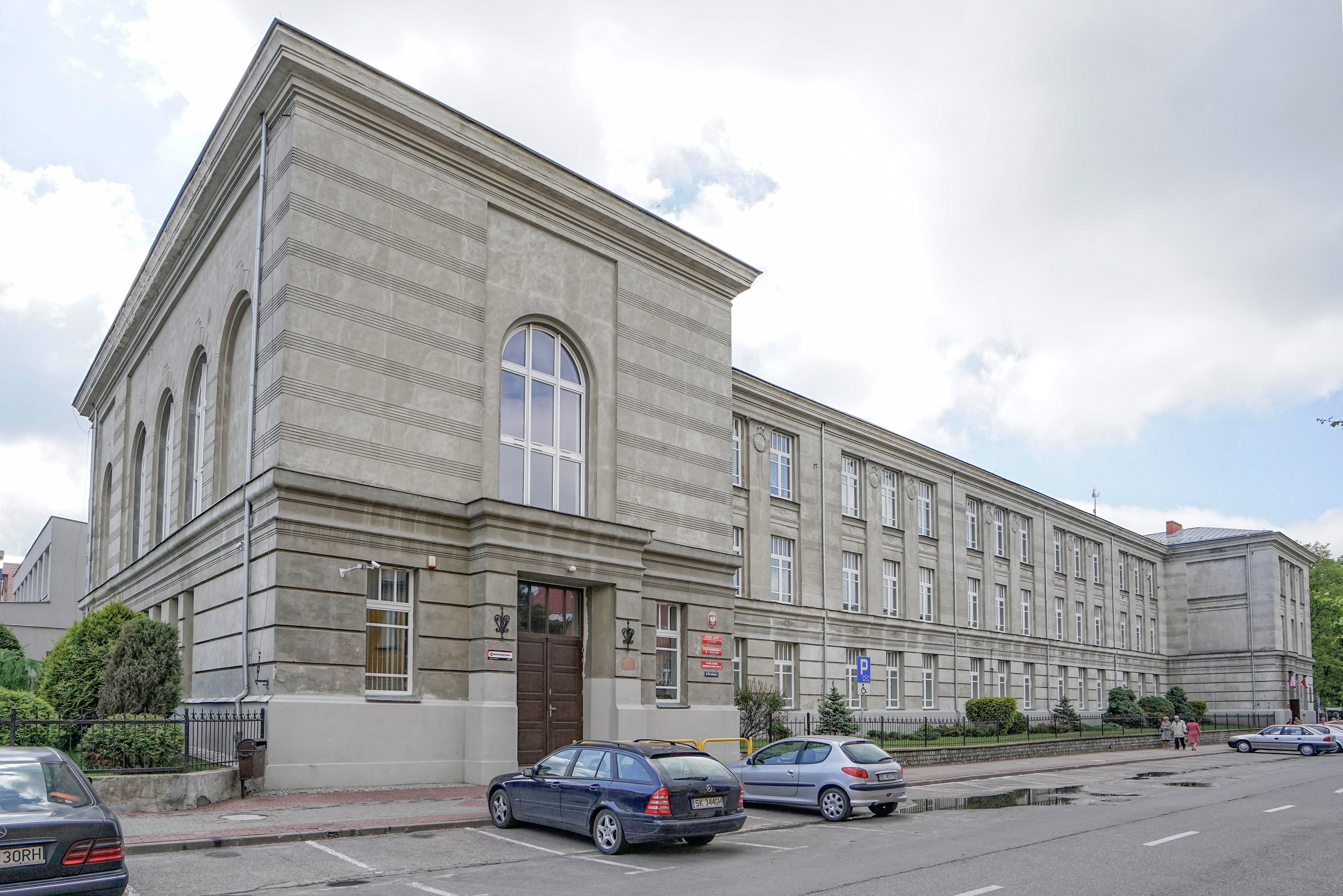
I Liceum Ogólnokształcące, named after Tadeusz Kościuszko (High School No. 1)

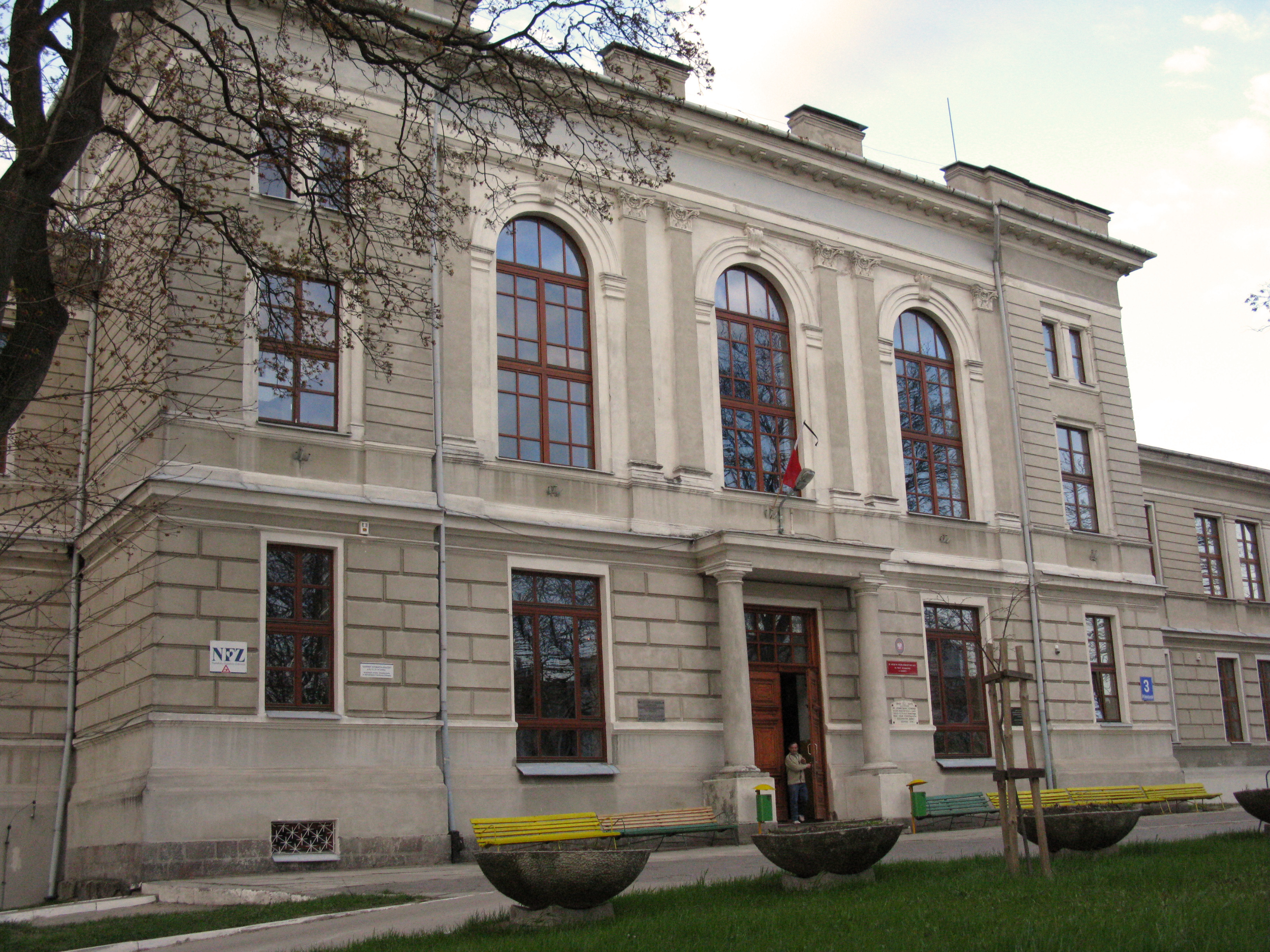
II Liceum Ogólnokształcące, named after Maria Konopnicka (High School No. 2)

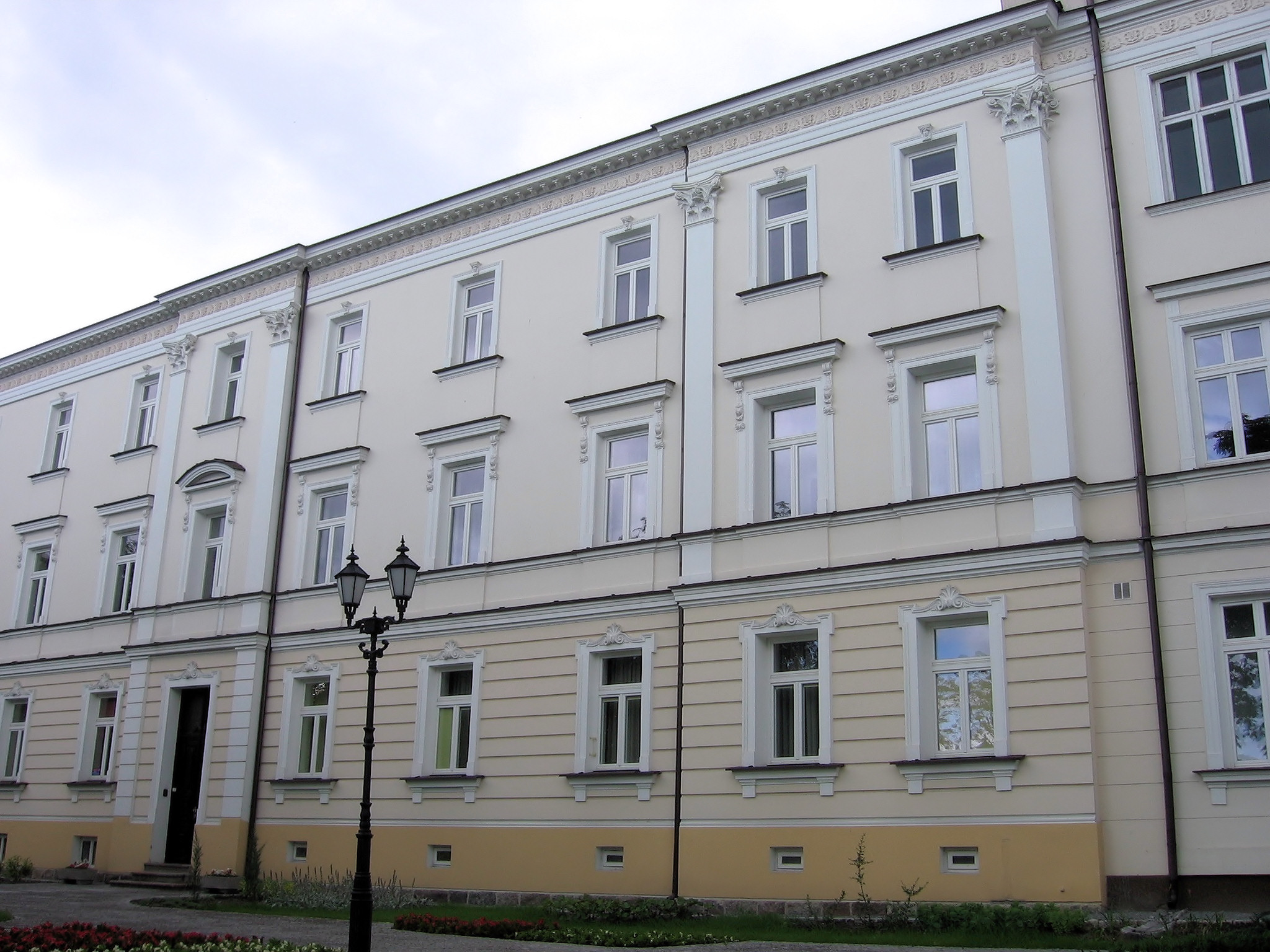
A building of a seminary school in Łomża

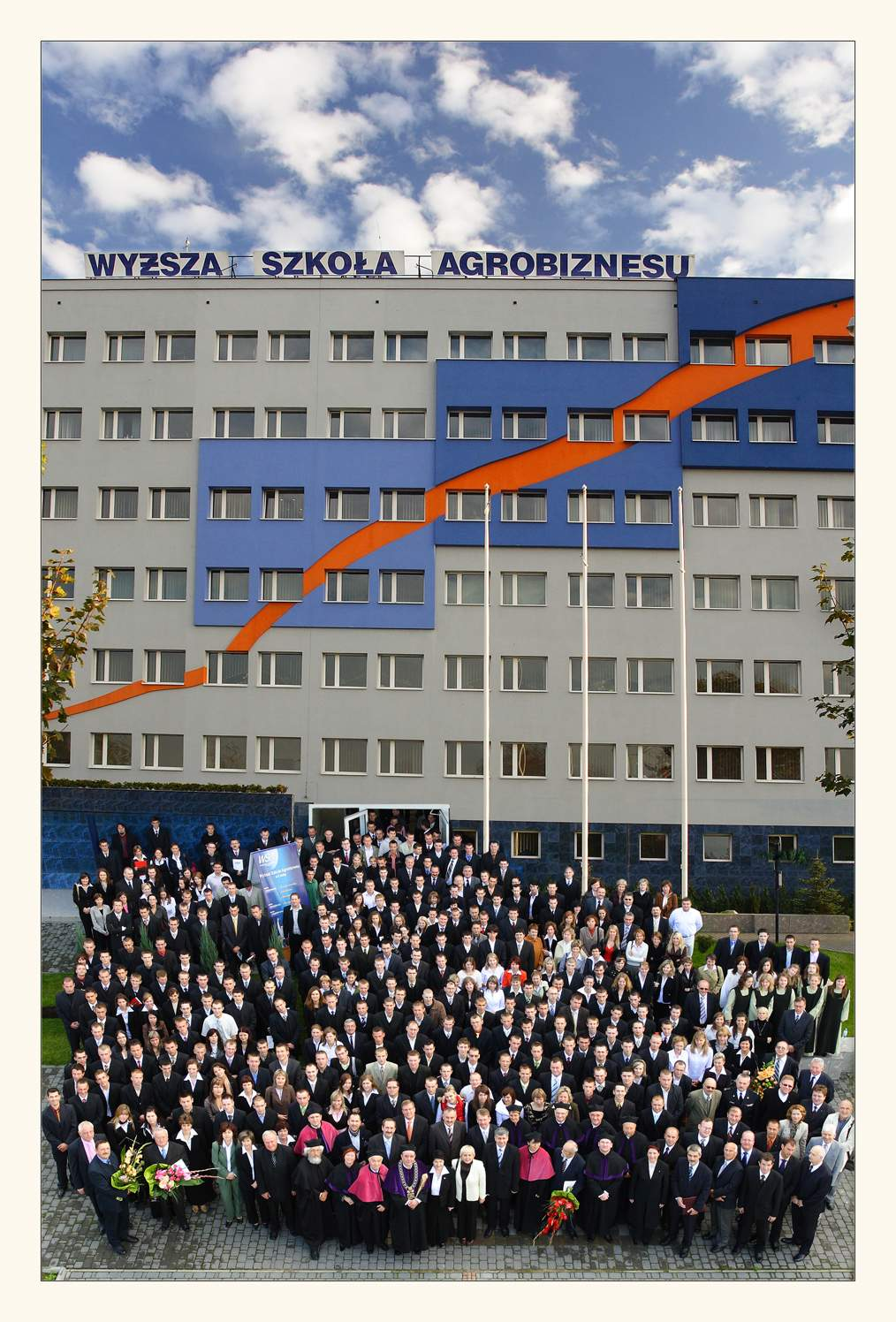
WSA Students group in the front of the main building

== Economy ==
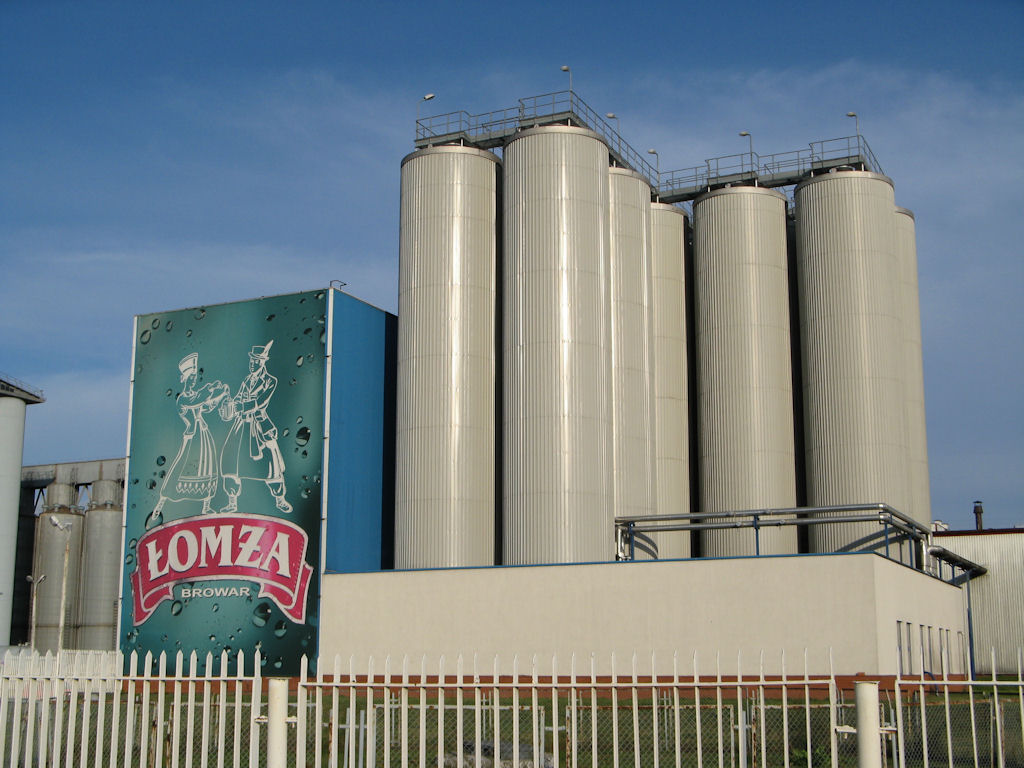
Browar Łomża (Brewery)

The economy of Łomża is closely connected to its natural environment, with agricultural and forestry industries at the forefront of the region's economic development. The economy is ecologically friendly, including the food industries, brewing, electronics, the manufacture of building materials and furniture, the production and processing of agricultural crops, as well as tourism and agro-tourism. Even the largest companies employ less than 1,000 workers, even though a number of firms are listed on the Podlaskie Top One Hundred Entrepreneurs. Among them, the Łomża Brewery (large-scale producer of beer), DOMEL (producer of unleaded windows), FARGOTEX (importer of upholstery fabrics), Konrad (importer of farm animals), Łomża furniture factory (Łomżyńska Fabryka Mebli), PEPEES (producer of potato starch), Purzeczko (the personal and property protection). On top of that, the city is a registered office of the Podlaskie Agency for Restructuring and Modernisation of Agriculture.

By the end of 2007, the number of people steadily employed in Łomża was 13,408, including 7,170 women, however, the unemployment rate (as of 2009) remained considerably high at 14.1 percent. The number of businesses registered by the end of 2008 was 6,421 of which 6,280 belonged to the private sector.

== Sports ==
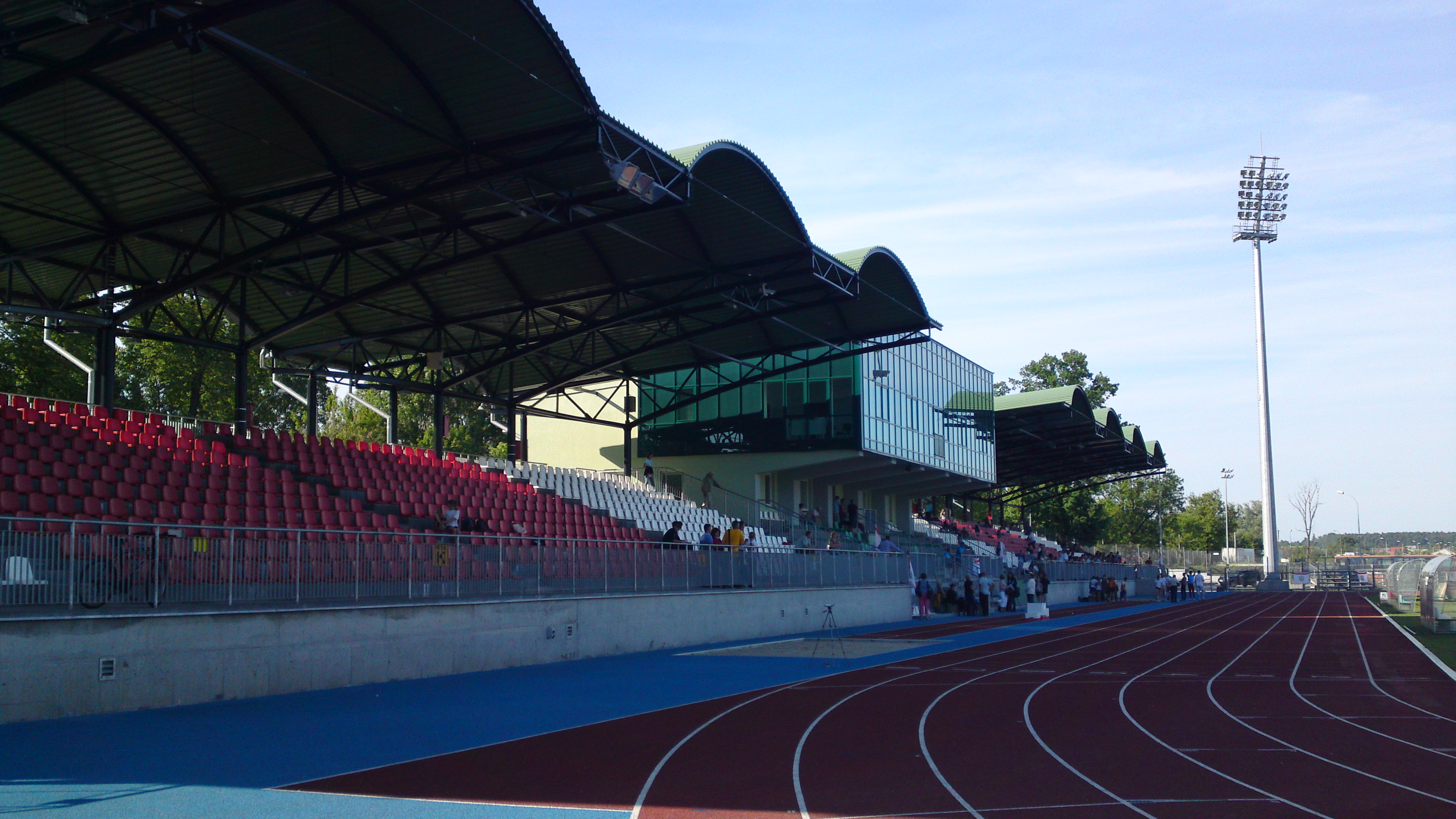
ŁKS Łomża Stadium

The history of sport in Łomża dates back to the end of the 19th century, when the first amateur races were held in 1897. Two years later, Łomża Rowing Society was established, and initiated its activities on 26 January 1902.

The first football club was founded on 16 April 1926, currently known as ŁKS Łomża. It is the city's most successful football club, having played on the Polish second tier in the 1930s, 1940s, and 2000s.

There are several sports clubs in town including volleyball, basketball, athletics, and martial arts. The inhabitants of the town have been the most successful in athletics, sports fighting and bodybuilding. Sports in Łomża are supported by the Society for Promoting Physical Culture and the Łomża School Sports Association. In 1998, an indoor sports arena opened for national and international sporting events, including indoor football matches and martial arts tournaments.

In 2009, a contract was signed for the construction of a municipal swimming pool to open in 2011, which is the second such facility in the city.

== Landmarks ==
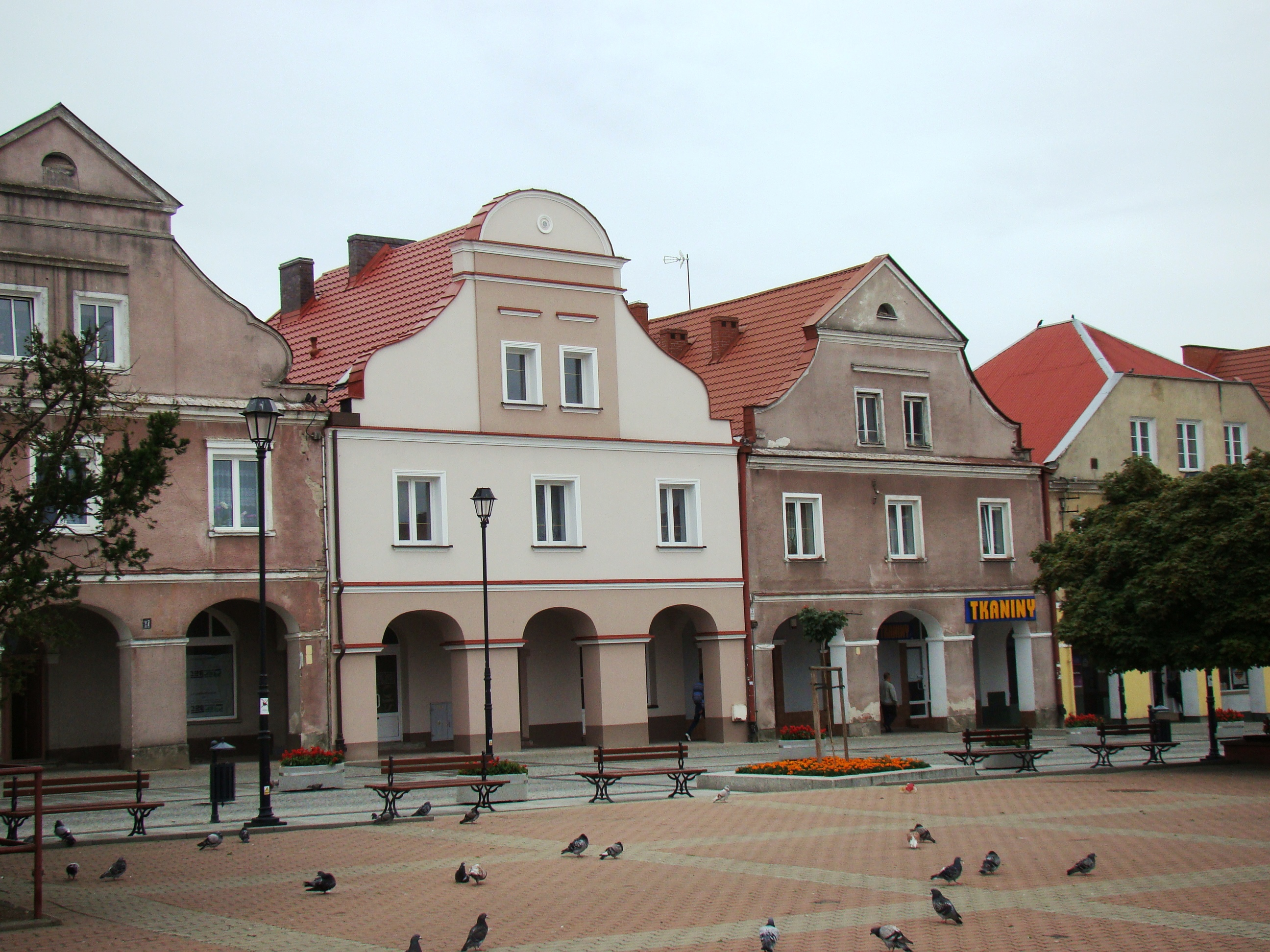
Tenement houses at the Stary Rynek (Old Market Square)

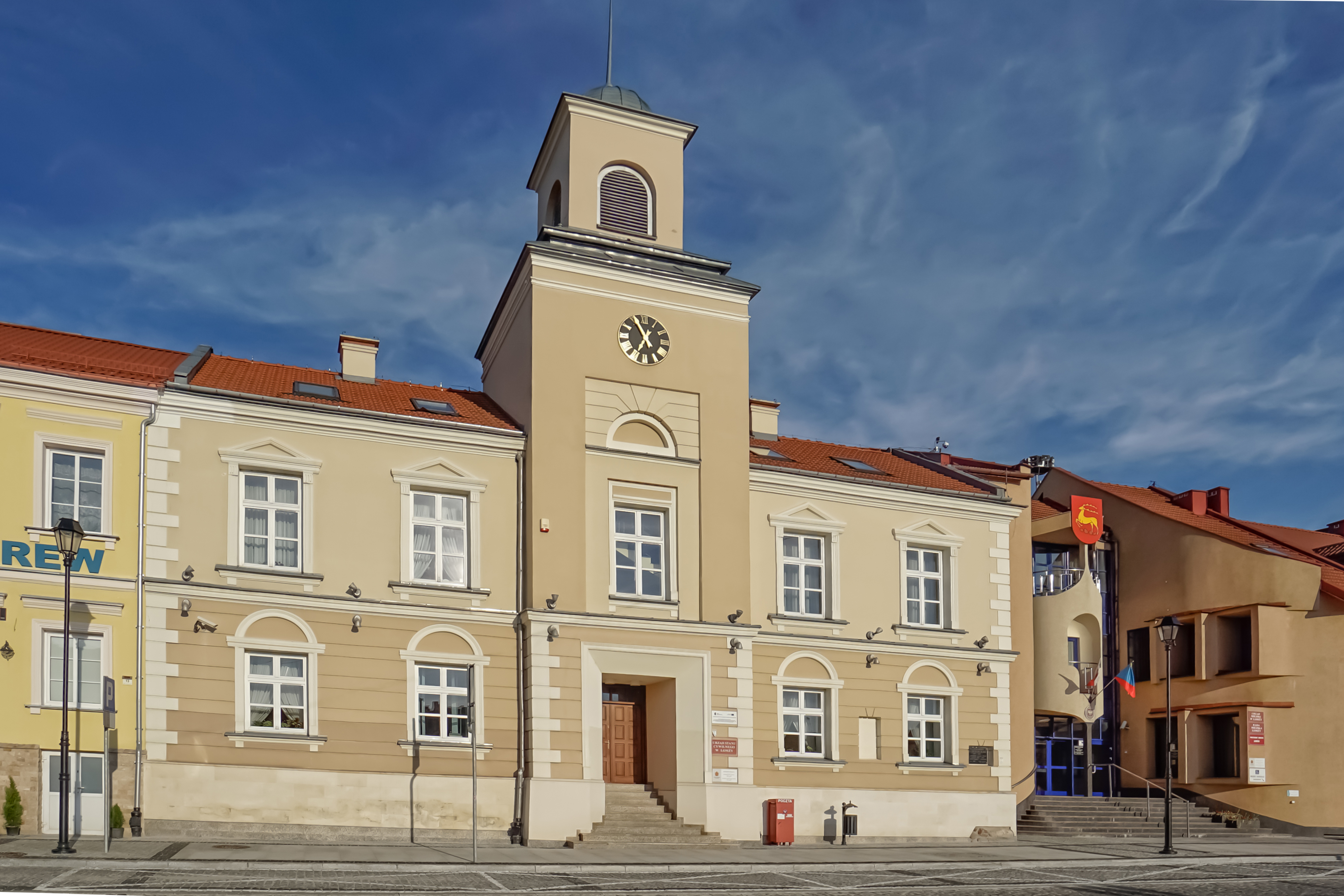
Łomża Town Hall (Ratusz)

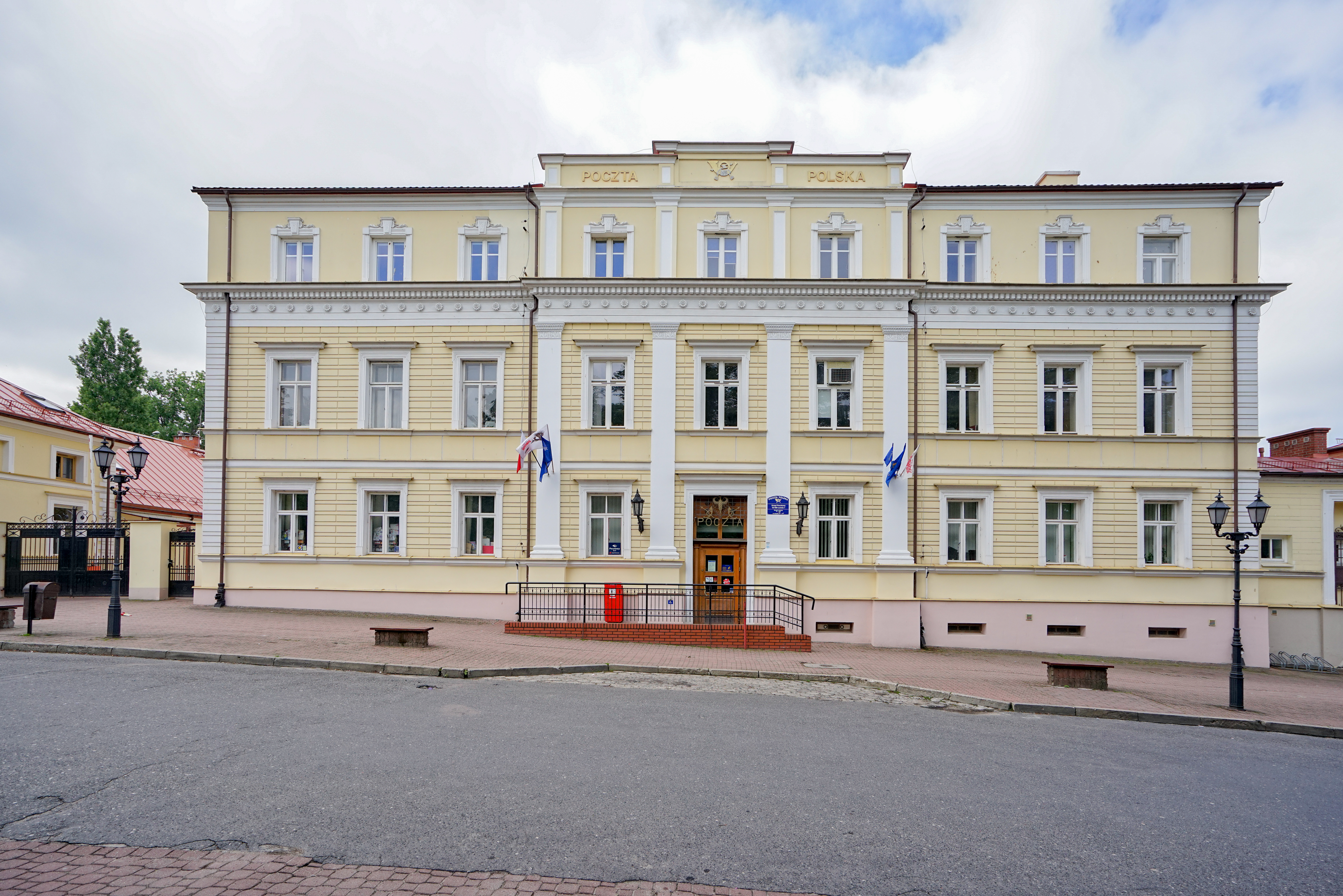
Main Post Office

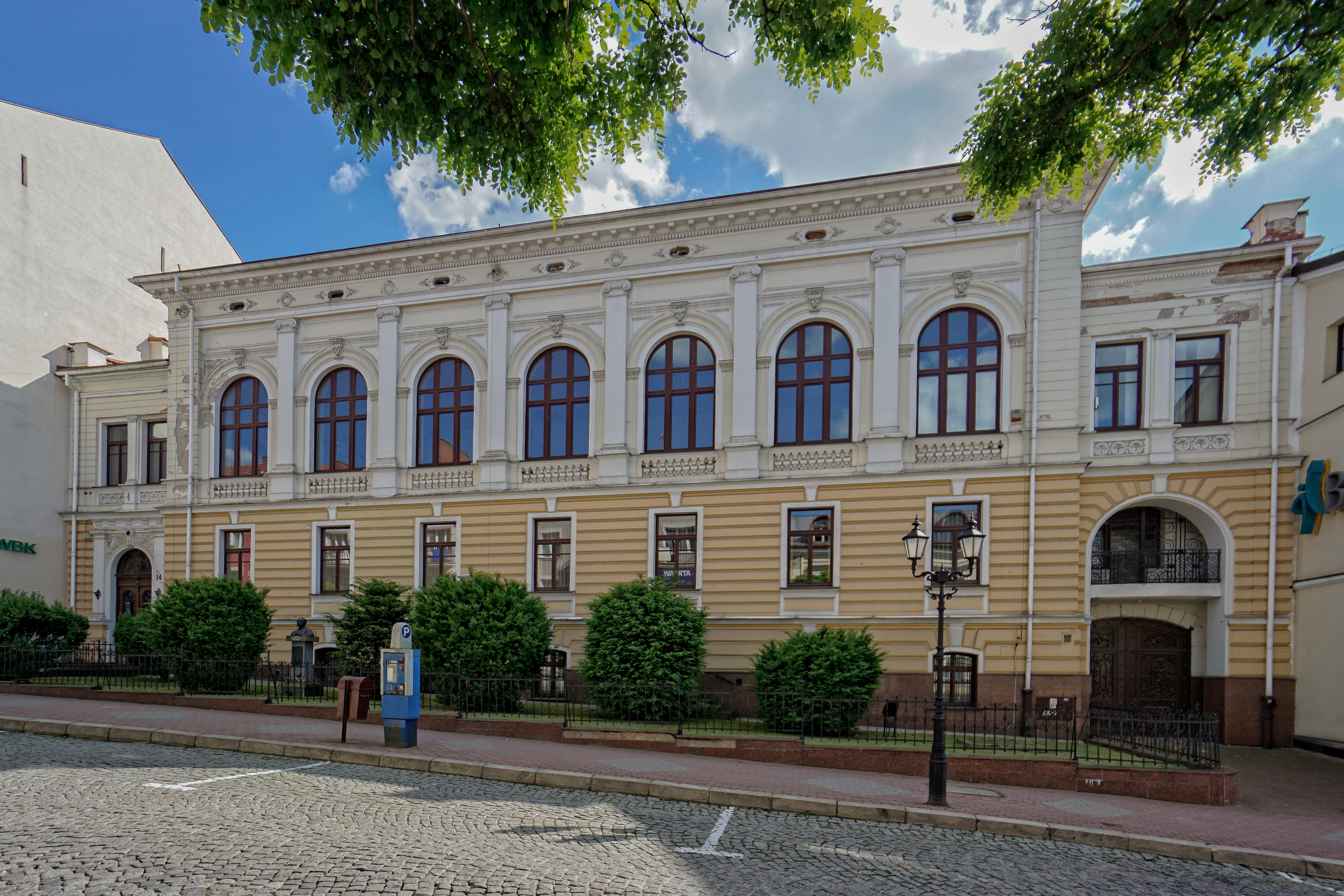
Former State Bank (Bank Państwa) building

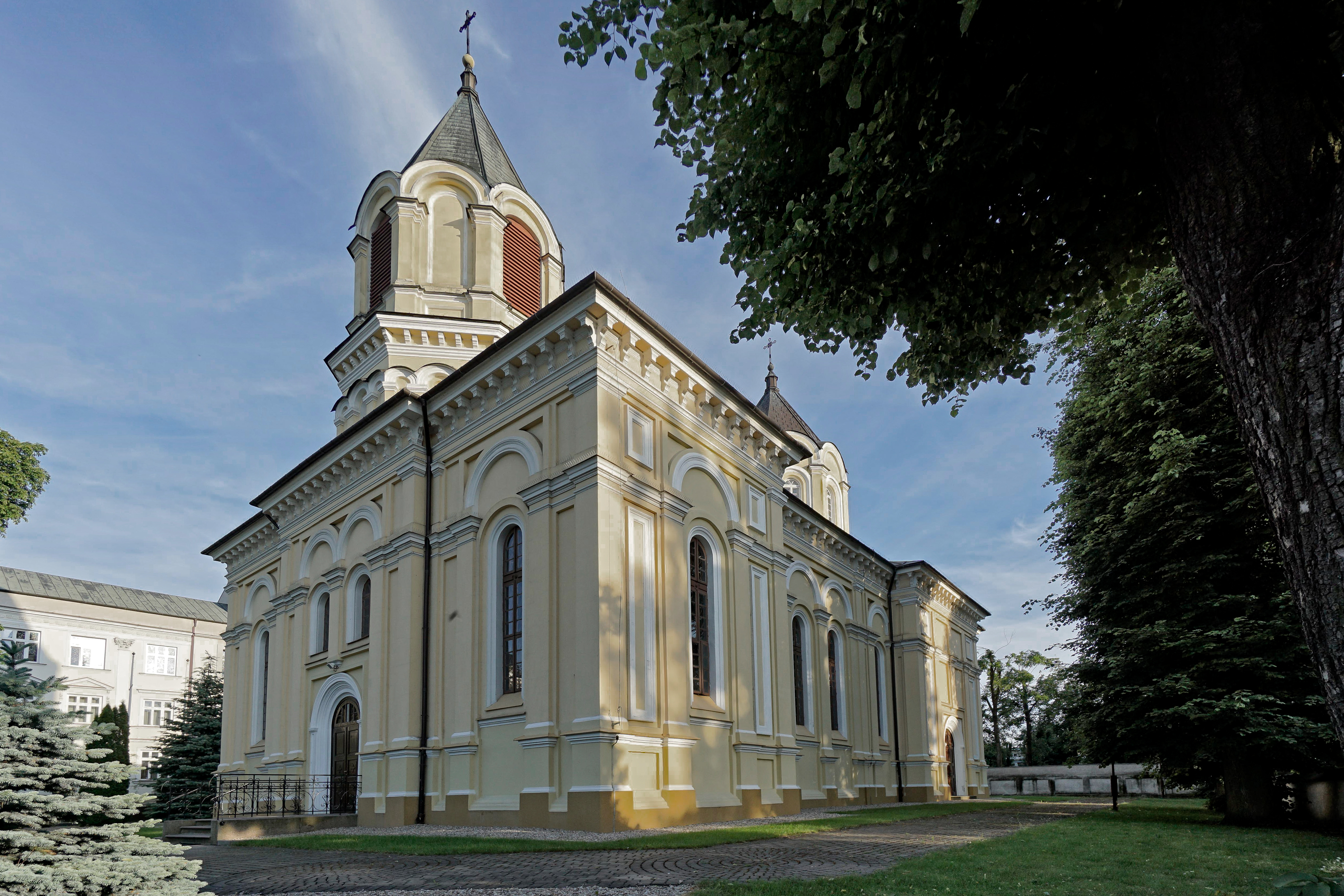
Church of the Assumption of Virgin Mary

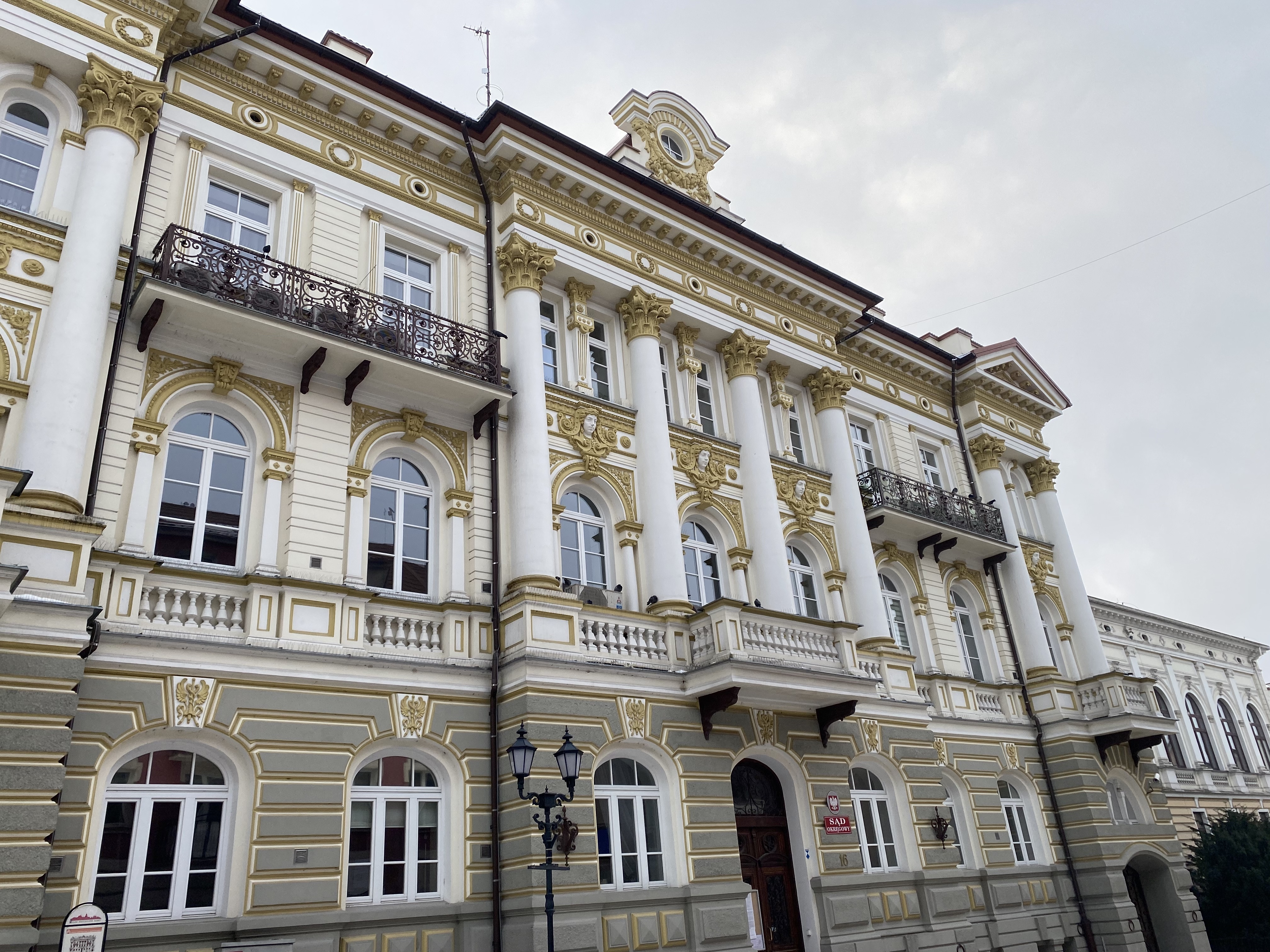
Regional Court in Łomża

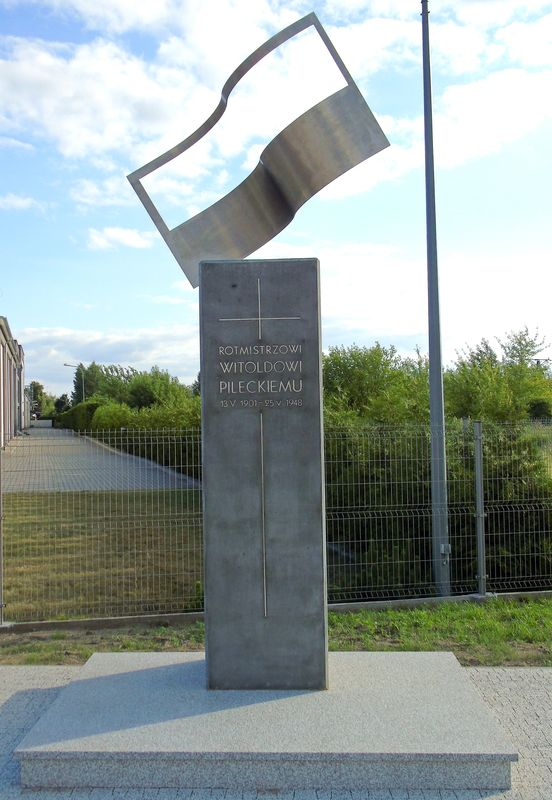
Monument to Witold Pilecki

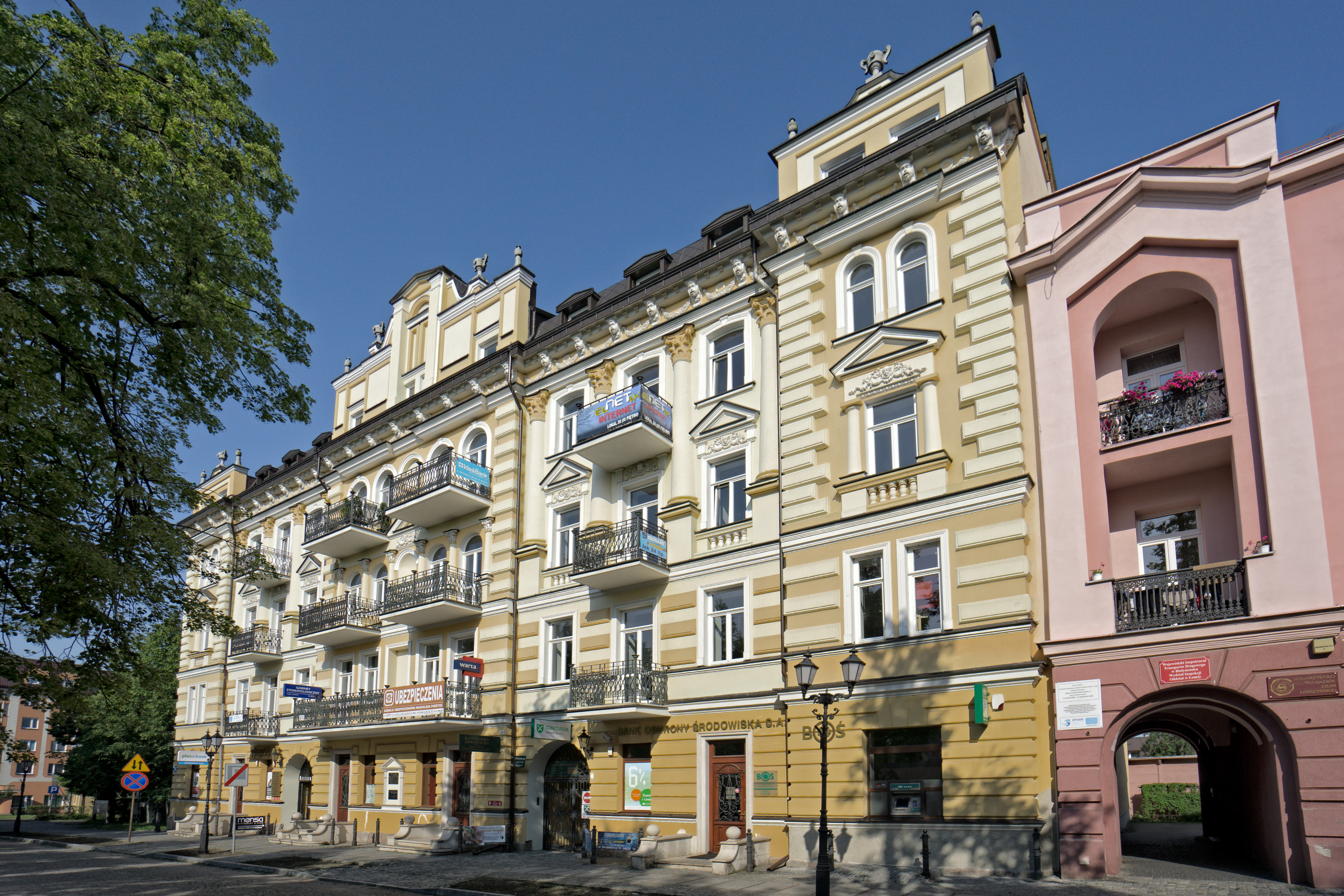
Śledziewski House (Kamienica Śledziewskich)

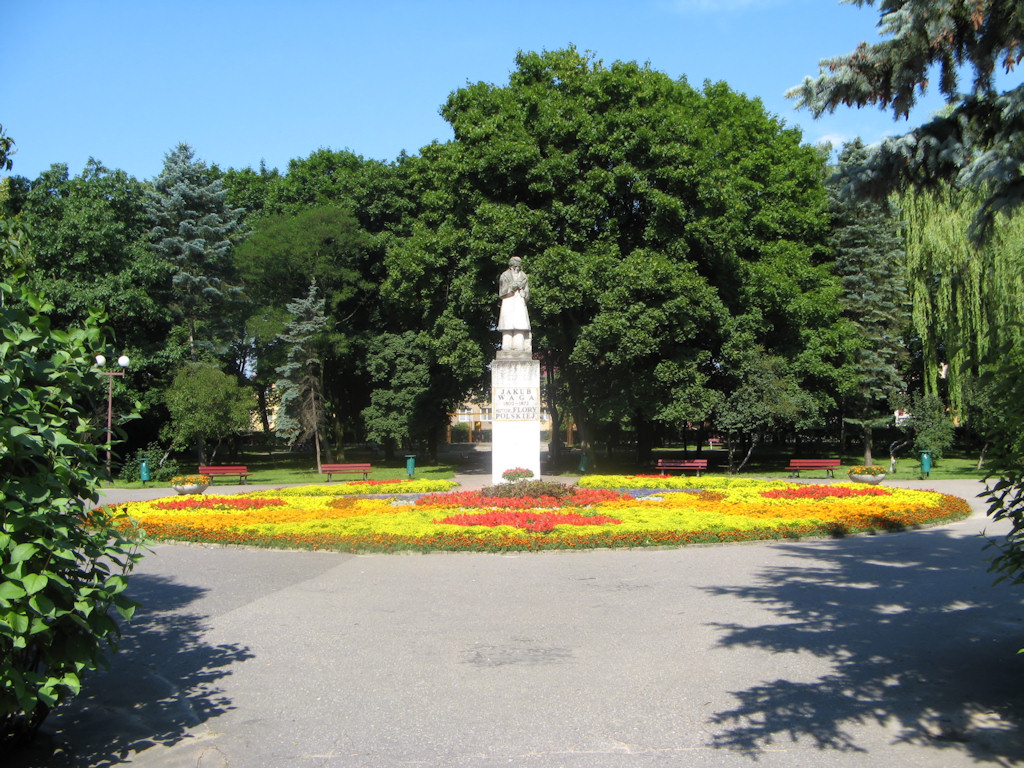
Jakub Waga Park

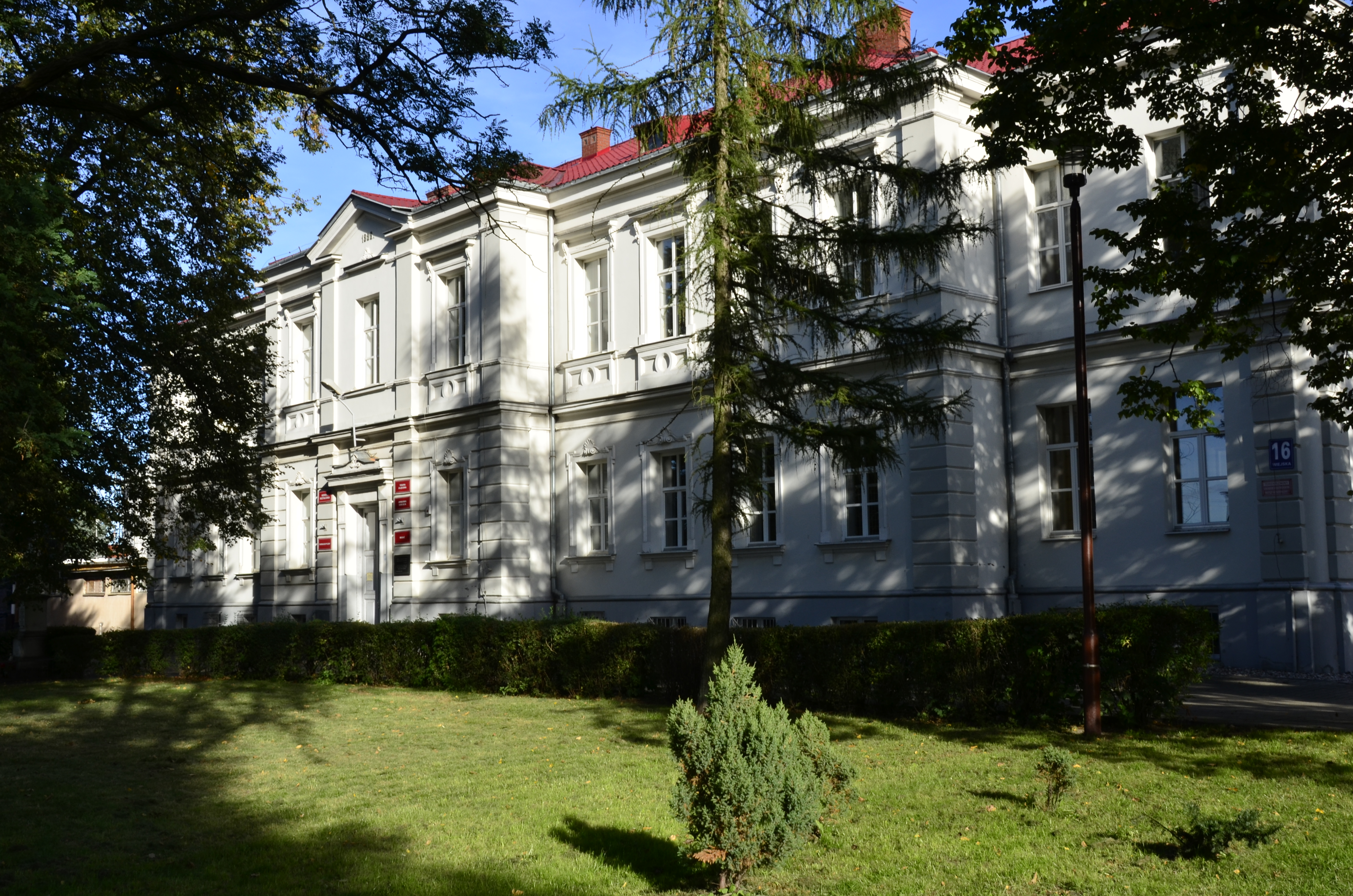
Former Holy Spirit Hospital

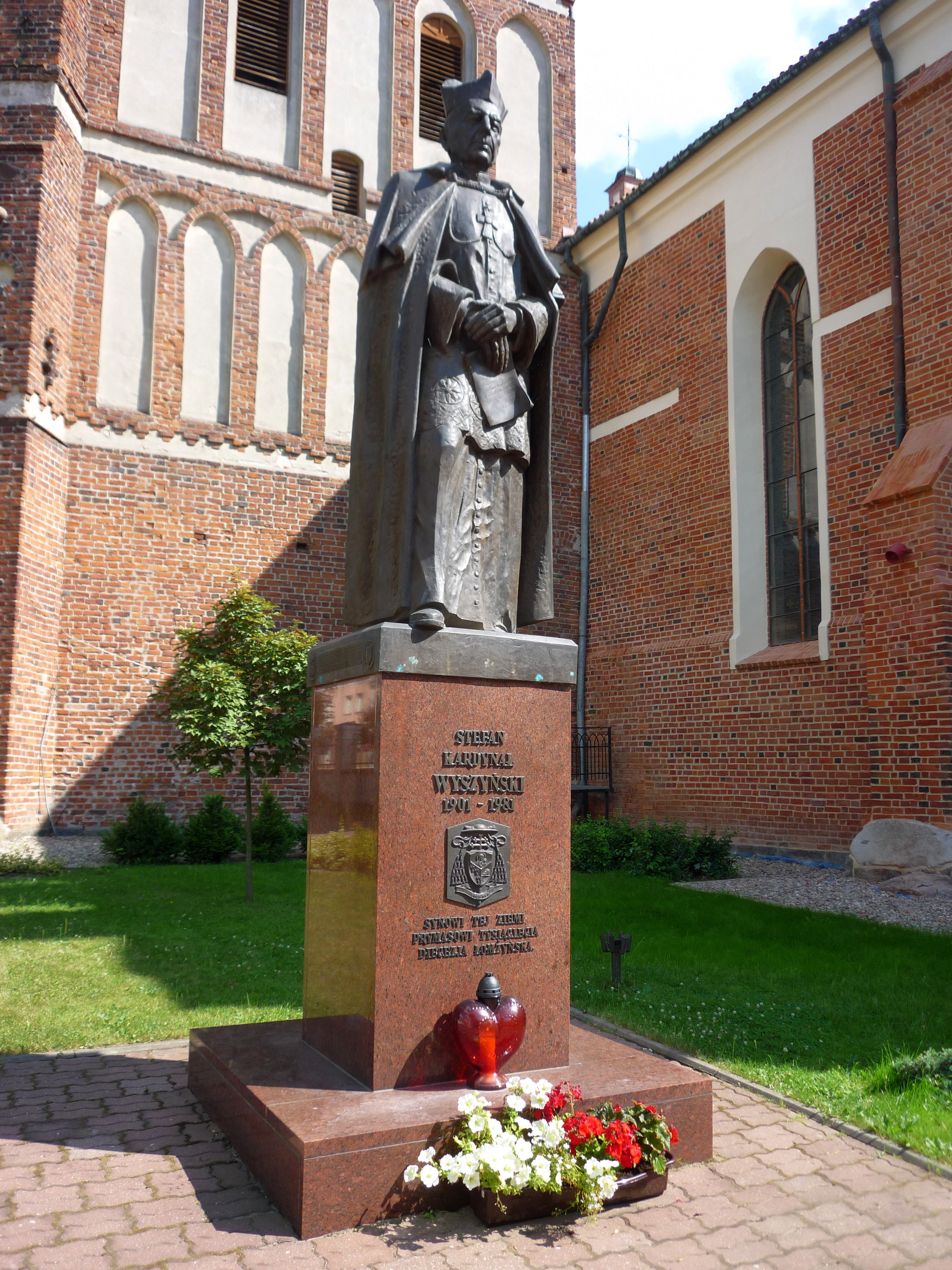
Monument to Cardinal Stefan Wyszyński

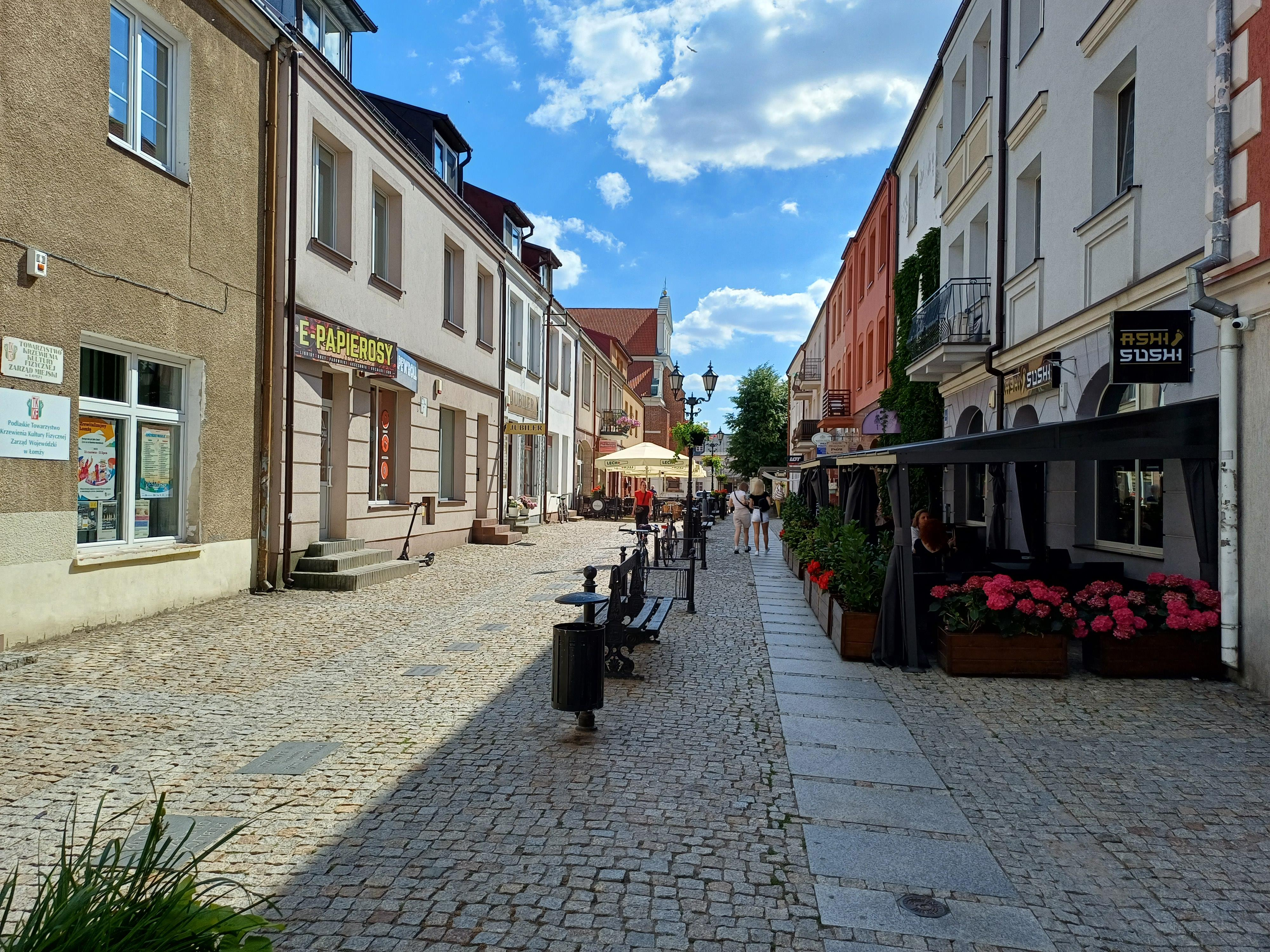
Farna Street

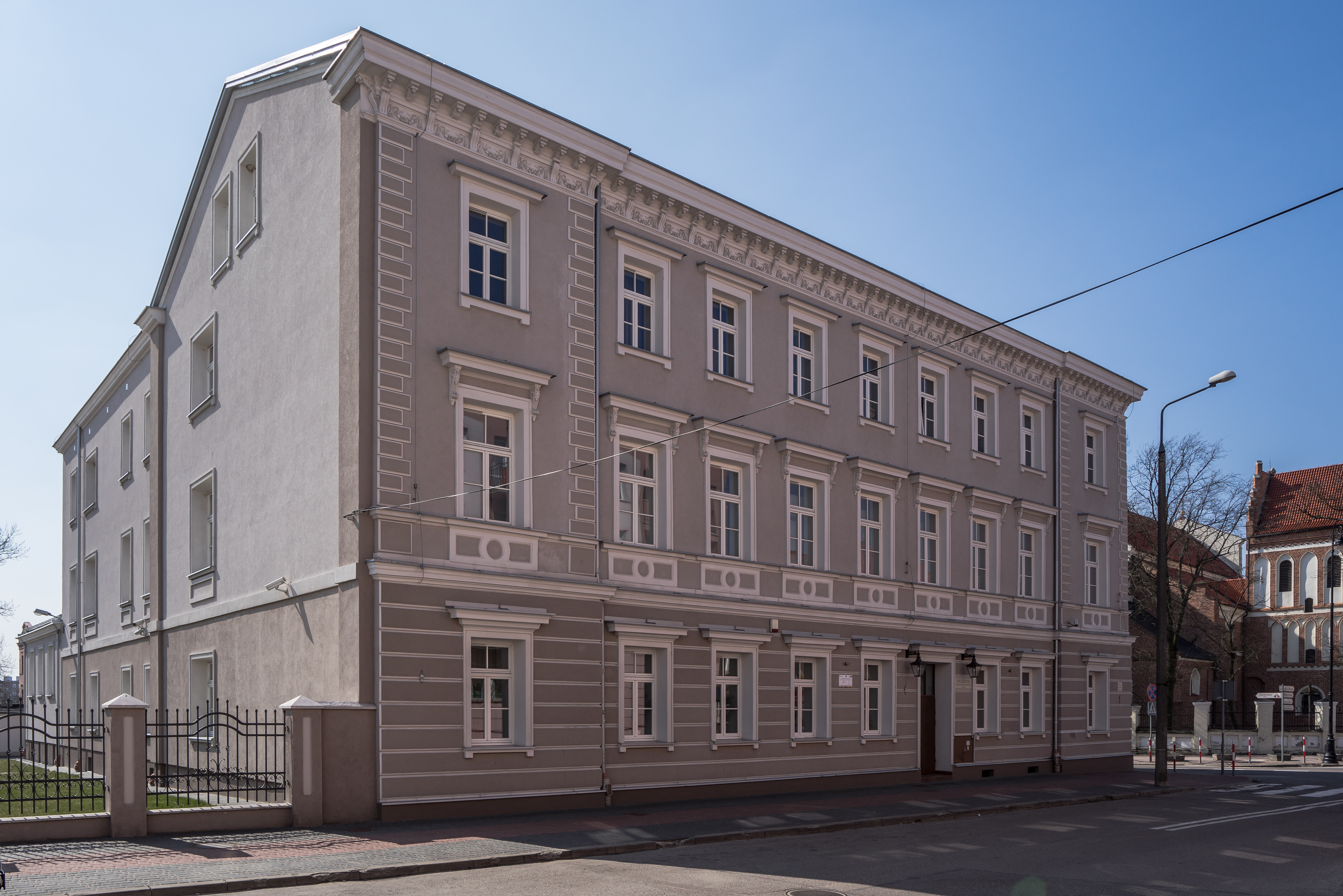
North-Masovian Museum (Muzeum Północno-Mazowieckie)

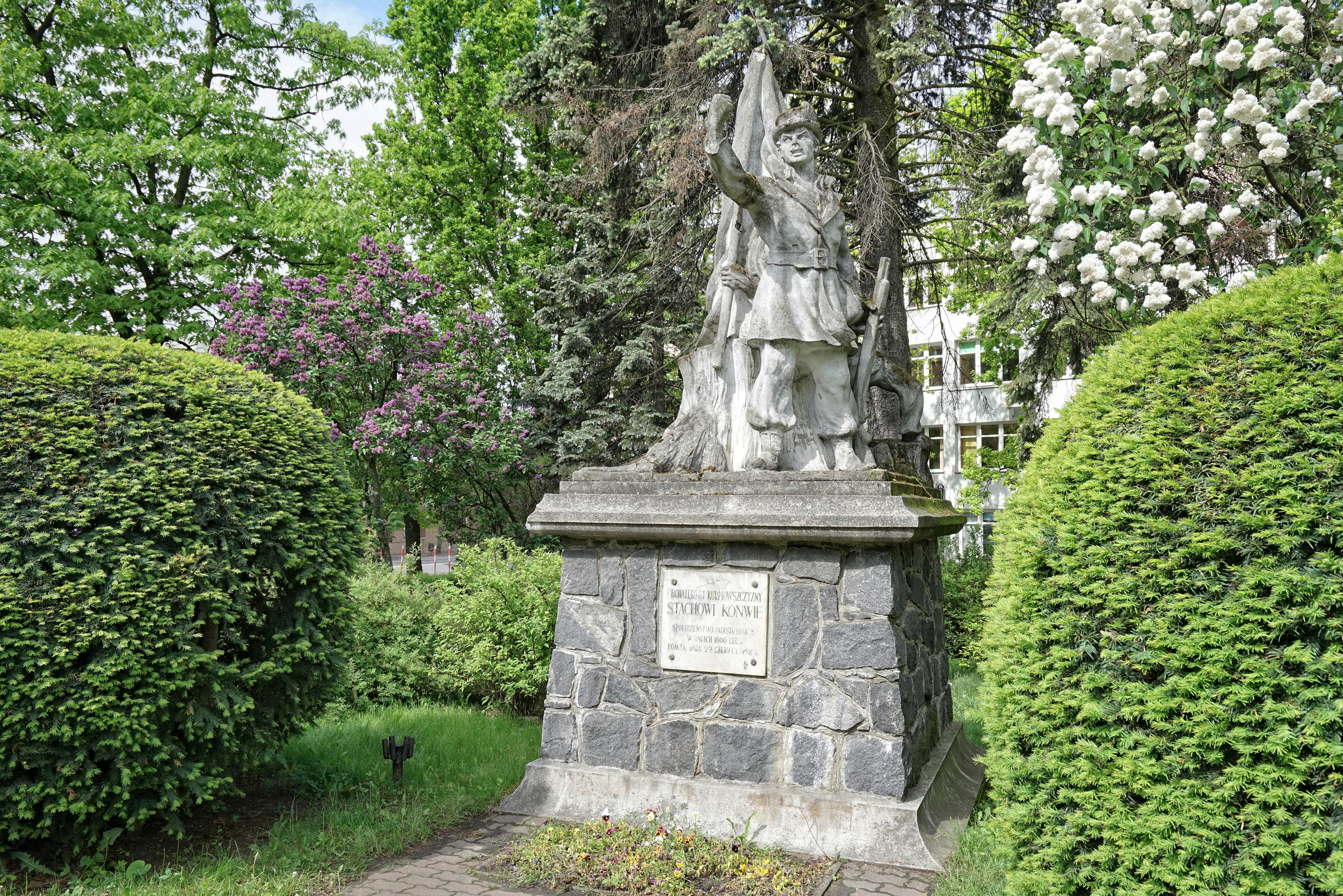
Monument to Stach Konwa

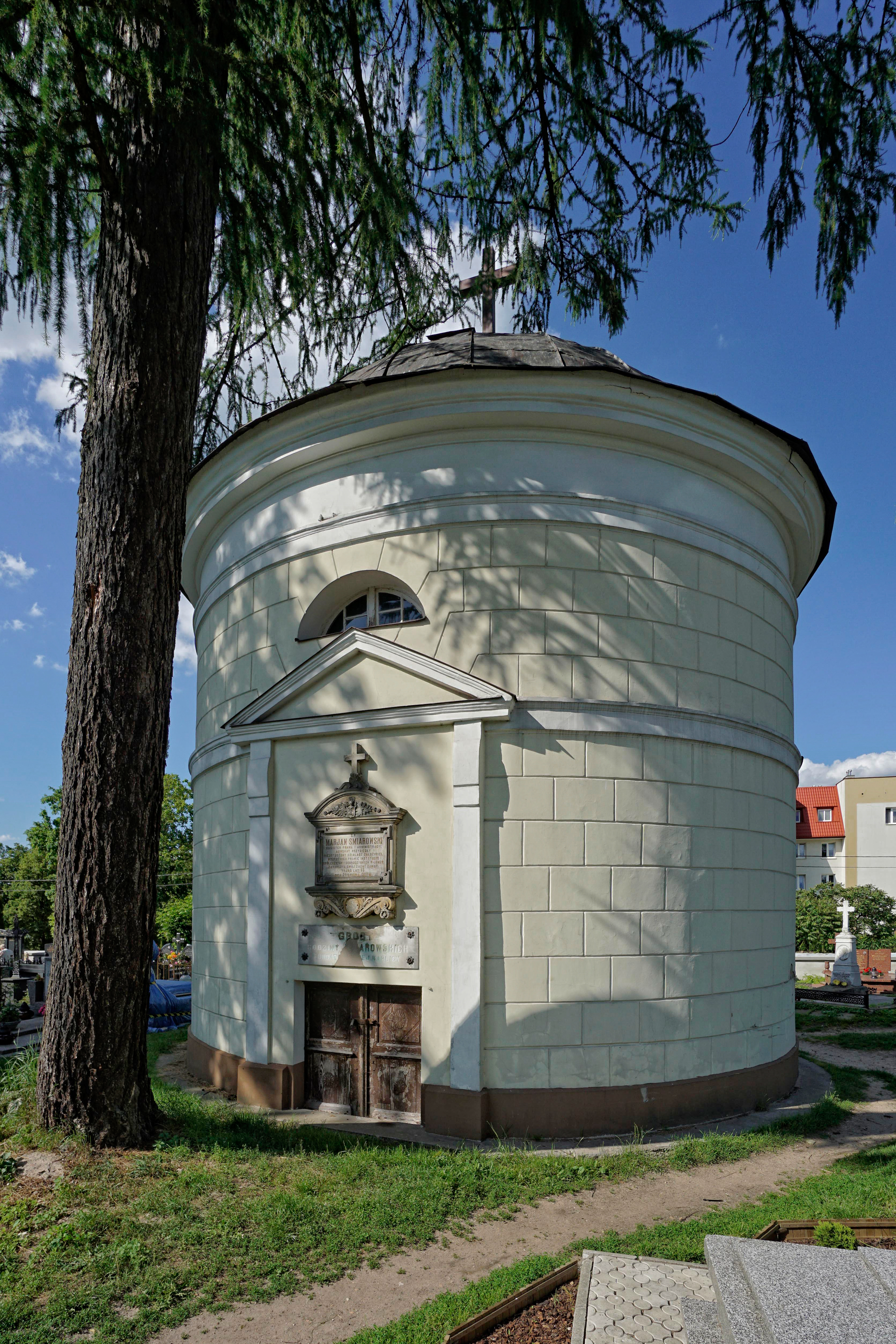
Śmiarowski cemetery chapel (19th century)

== Transport ==
The S61 expressway bypasses Łomża to the west. Exits 6 and 5 of the expressway provide for quick access to Suwałki and to Warsaw to the south-west.

Łomża railway station serves the city. It reopened in 2026 after being closed between 1993 and 2026, with the original station dating back to 1915.

The local Śniadowo–Łomża railway was extensively rebuilt in 2026 and linked to a new 1 km junction at Śniadowo, enabling direct passenger services to and from Białystok. The modernised 77 km route, along with new or upgraded stations in Łomża, Konarzyce, Koziki, Czachy-Kołaki, Kulesze Kościelne, Sokoły, and Śniadowo, officially entered passenger service on June 14, 2026. Direct services to Warsaw are planned to commence in 2027, following the completion of upgrades on the connecting line to Tłuszcz from Ostrołęka.

Up to 19 coaches a day operated by Flixbus / Polski Bus make the 2 hour journeys to Białystok and Warsaw.

The closest international airport to Łomża is Warsaw Modlin (WMI) (approx. 125 km), while Warsaw Chopin (WAW) (approx. 134 km) is the primary major hub.

== Notable people ==
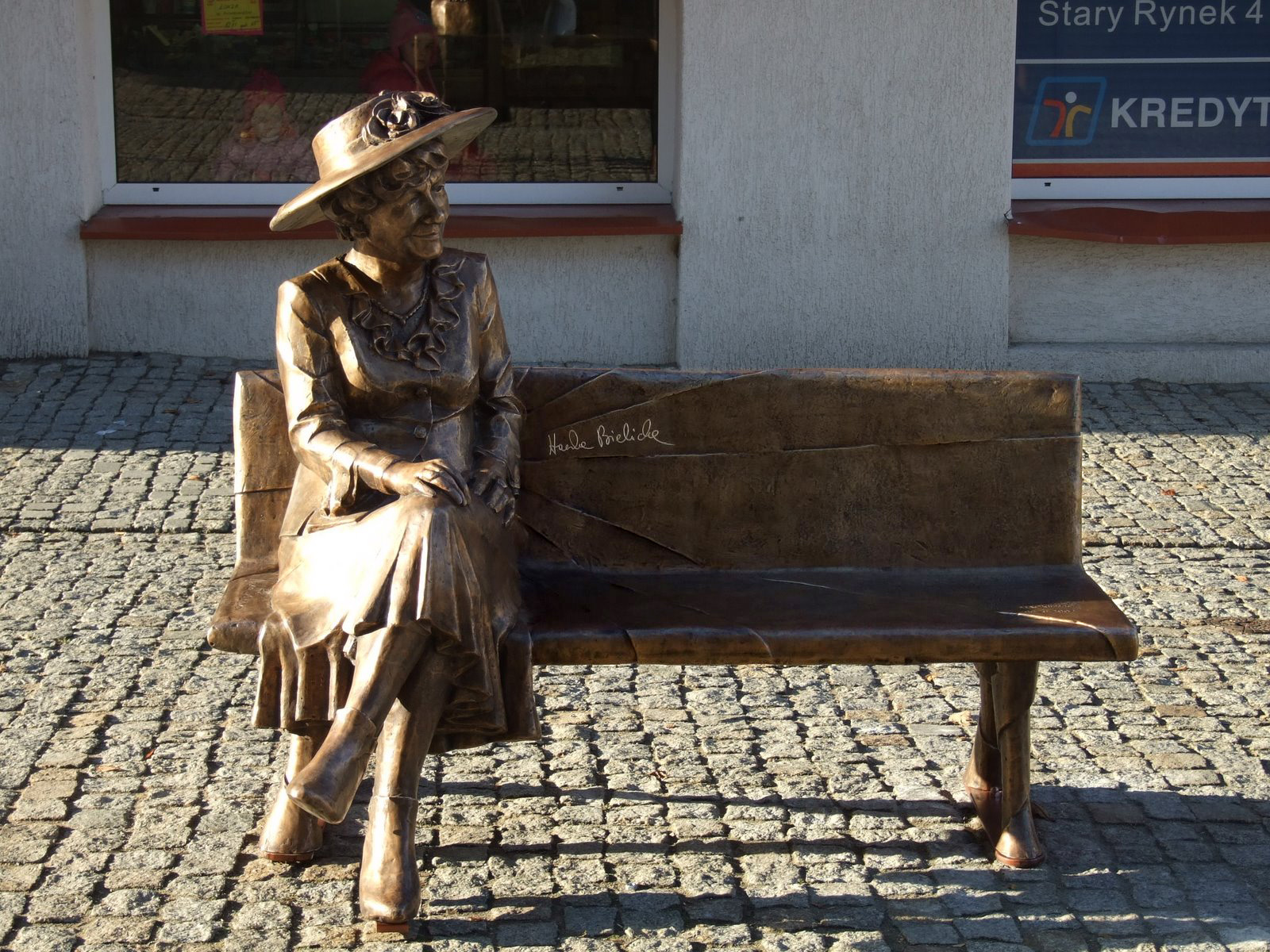
Monument to Hanka Bielicka

- Hanka Bielicka (1915–2006), Polish actress
- Andrew Bobola (1591–1657), Polish Roman Catholic saint
- Yehoshua Leib Diskin (1818–1898), rabbi
- Julita Fabiszewska (born 1991), Polish singer/songwriter; participant in Bitwa na głos.
- Yitzhak HaLevi Herzog (1888–1959), Chief Rabbi of Israel and father of Chaim Herzog, 6th President of Israel
- Adam Kownacki (born 1989), Polish Heavyweight boxer
- Samuel A. Levine (1891–1966), American cardiologist
- Michał Piaszczyński (1885–1940), Polish Catholic priest, killed by the German Nazis
- Rajmund Rembieliński (1774–1841), Polish nobleman, activist and landowner
- Maciej Tercjak (born 1994), Polish kickboxer and karate-ka

== Twin towns ==
- Mátranovák, Hungary
- Muscatine, United States of America
- Kolomyia, Ukraine
- Tallinn, Estonia
- Boryslav, Ukraine

== See also ==
- Łomża Landscape Park
- List of cities in Poland
