= Goski =

Goski may refer to:

== People ==
- Dana G. Goski (born 1967), Canadian-born materials scientist
- Kasper Goski 16th century Polish doctor, astrologer and the mayor of Poznań

== Places ==
- A number of villages in Poland, including:
  - Boruty-Goski
  - Goski-Pełki
  - Tarnowo-Goski
  - Goski Duże
