= Skarżyn =

Skarżyn may refer to:

- Skarżyn, Łódź Voivodeship (central Poland)
- Skarżyn, Ostrołęka County in Masovian Voivodeship (east-central Poland)
- Skarżyn, Siedlce County in Masovian Voivodeship (east-central Poland)
- Skarżyn, Węgrów County in Masovian Voivodeship (east-central Poland)
- Skarżyn, Greater Poland Voivodeship (west-central Poland)
- Skarżyn, Warmian-Masurian Voivodeship (north Poland)

== See also ==
- Nowy Skarżyn, Poland (literally "New Skarzyn")
- Stary Skarżyn, Poland (literally "Old Skarzyn")
