= Ostrożne =

- Village
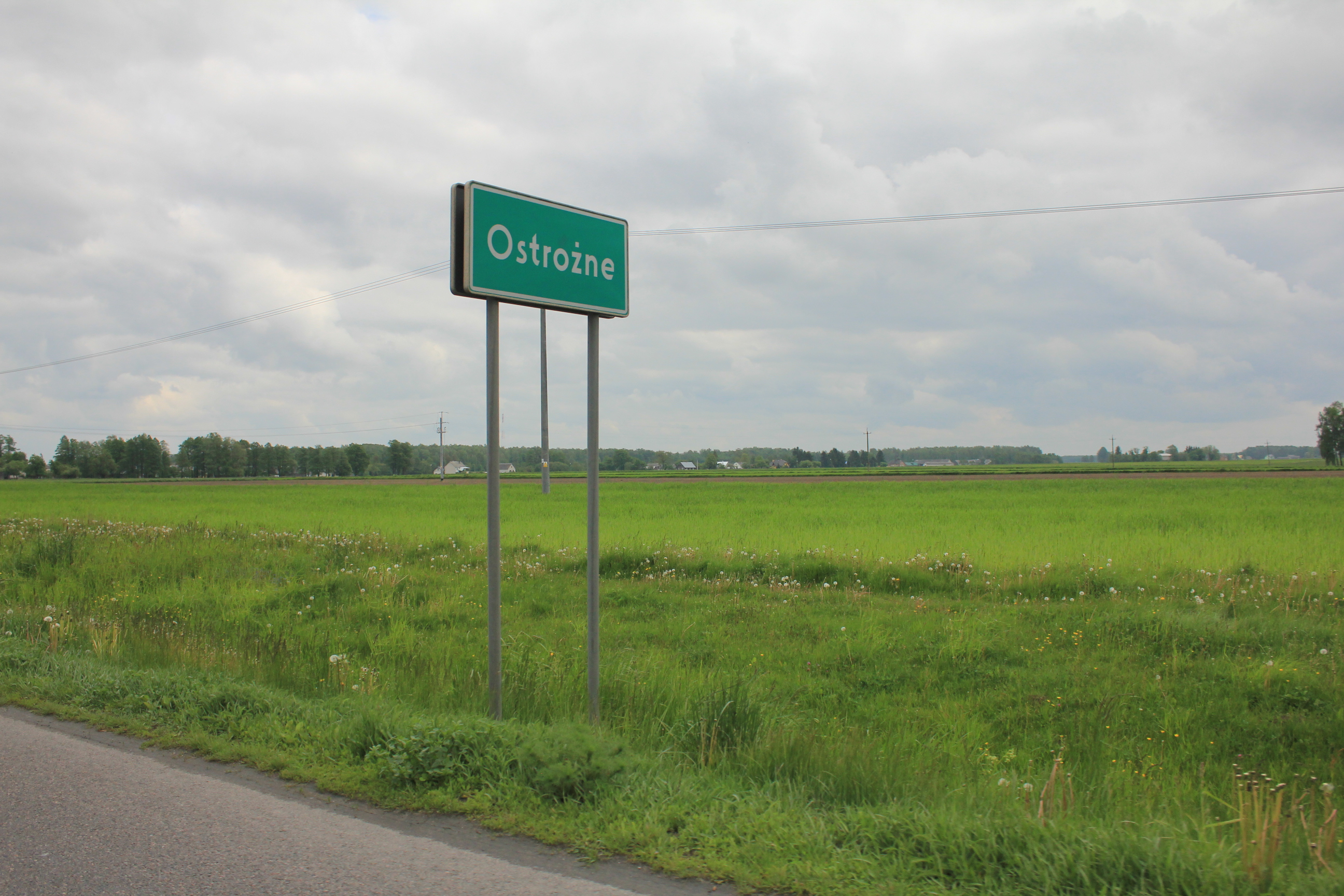
- Entrance to Ostrożne

- Location within Poland
- Coordinates: 52°56′28″N 22°09′20″E
- Country: Poland
- Voivodeship: Podlaskie
- County: Zambrów
- Gmina: Szumowo

Ostrożne [ɔsˈtrɔʐnɛ] is a village in the administrative district of Gmina Szumowo, within Zambrów County, Podlaskie Voivodeship, in north-eastern Poland.
