= Grochy-Pogorzele =

- Village
- Location within Poland
- Coordinates: 52°54′35″N 22°15′24″E
- Country: Poland
- Voivodeship: Podlaskie
- County: Zambrów
- Gmina: Zambrów

Grochy-Pogorzele [ˈɡrɔxɨ pɔɡɔˈʐɛlɛ] is a village in the administrative district of Gmina Zambrów, within Zambrów County, Podlaskie Voivodeship, in north-eastern Poland.
