= Łady-Borowe =

Village in Gmina Zambrów, Poland

- Village
- Location within Poland
- Coordinates: 53°03′38″N 22°15′16″E
- Country: Poland
- Voivodeship: Podlaskie
- County: Zambrów
- Gmina: Zambrów

Łady-Borowe [ˈwadɨ bɔˈrɔvɛ] is a village in the administrative district of Gmina Zambrów, within Zambrów County, Podlaskie Voivodeship, in north-eastern Poland.
