= Wiśniówek-Wertyce =

- Village
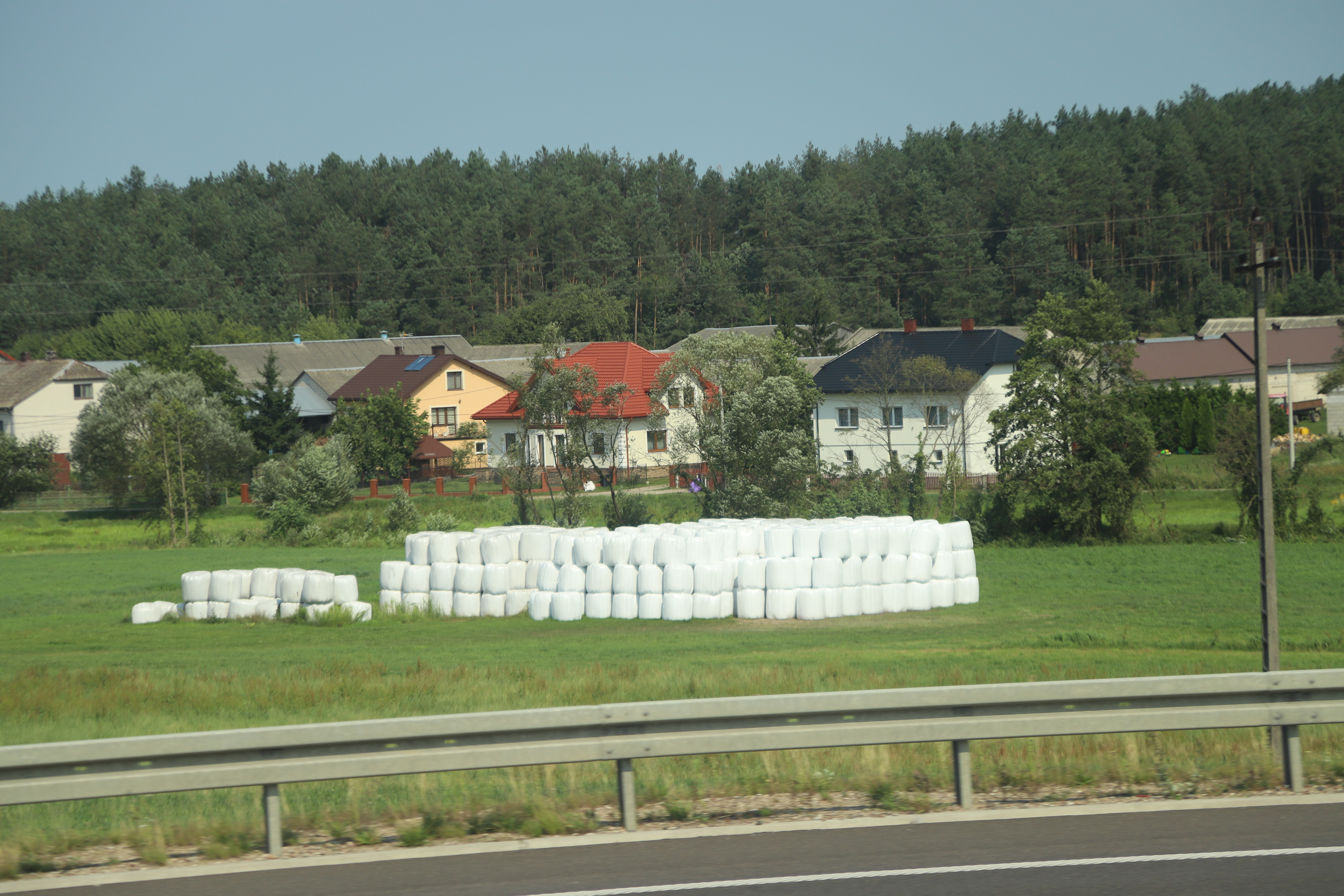

- Location within Poland
- Coordinates: 53°03′24″N 22°22′52″E
- Country: Poland
- Voivodeship: Podlaskie
- County: Zambrów
- Gmina: Kołaki Kościelne

Wiśniówek-Wertyce [viɕˈɲuvɛk vɛrˈtɨt͡sɛ] is a village in the administrative district of Gmina Kołaki Kościelne, within Zambrów County, Podlaskie Voivodeship, in north-eastern Poland.
