= Przeździecko-Drogoszewo =

Village in Gmina Zambrów, Poland

- Village
- Location within Poland
- Coordinates: 52°52′59″N 22°14′43″E
- Country: Poland
- Voivodeship: Podlaskie
- County: Zambrów
- Gmina: Zambrów
- Postal code: 18-300
- Vehicle registration: BZA

Przeździecko-Drogoszewo [pʂɛʑˈd͡ʑɛt͡skɔ drɔɡɔˈʂɛvɔ] is a village in the administrative district of Gmina Zambrów, within Zambrów County, Podlaskie Voivodeship, in north-eastern Poland.

Four Polish citizens were murdered by Nazi Germany in the village during World War II.
