= Zaręby-Jartuzy =

- Village
- Location within Poland
- Coordinates: 52°54′51″N 22°01′23″E
- Country: Poland
- Voivodeship: Podlaskie
- County: Zambrów
- Gmina: Szumowo
- Population: 130

Zaręby-Jartuzy [zaˈrɛmbɨ jarˈtuzɨ] is a village in the administrative district of Gmina Szumowo, within Zambrów County, Podlaskie Voivodeship, in north-eastern Poland.
