= Wola Zambrowska =

- Village
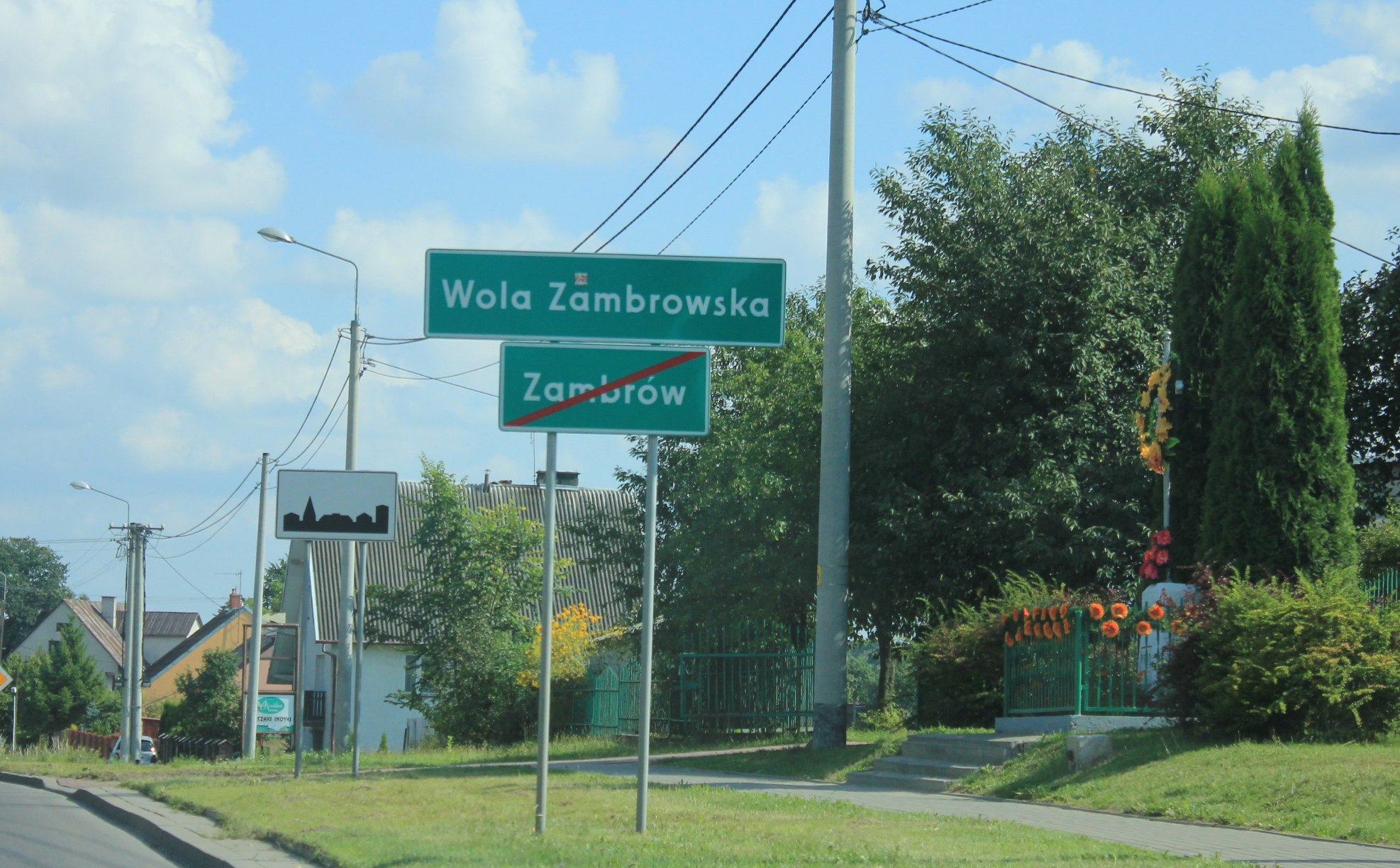

- Location within Poland
- Coordinates: 52°58′N 22°16′E
- Country: Poland
- Voivodeship: Podlaskie
- County: Zambrów
- Gmina: Zambrów
- Population: 1,000

Wola Zambrowska [ˈvɔla zamˈbrɔfska] is a village in north-east Poland near Zambrów in Podlaskie Voivodeship. Wola Zambrowska is the largest village in Gmina Zambrów.

== History ==
In 1423, the Mazovian prince Janusz I gave the Łętowo forest and Stawiska seat to Ślubowo knights. In 1526, Wola Zambrowska became royal property. Wola Zambrowska was a big village for many years - in 1921 it had 284 inhabitants and had grown to about 1,000 inhabitants in 2007.
