= Łubnice-Krusze =

Village in Gmina Kołaki Kościelne, Poland

- Village
- Location within Poland
- Coordinates: 53°02′49″N 22°18′03″E
- Country: Poland
- Voivodeship: Podlaskie
- County: Zambrów
- Gmina: Kołaki Kościelne
- Elevation: 100 m (330 ft)
- Population: 1,000

Łubnice-Krusze [wubˈnit͡sɛ ˈkruʂɛ] is a village in the administrative district of Gmina Kołaki Kościelne, within Zambrów County, Podlaskie Voivodeship, in north-eastern Poland.
