= Czarnowo-Undy =

- Village
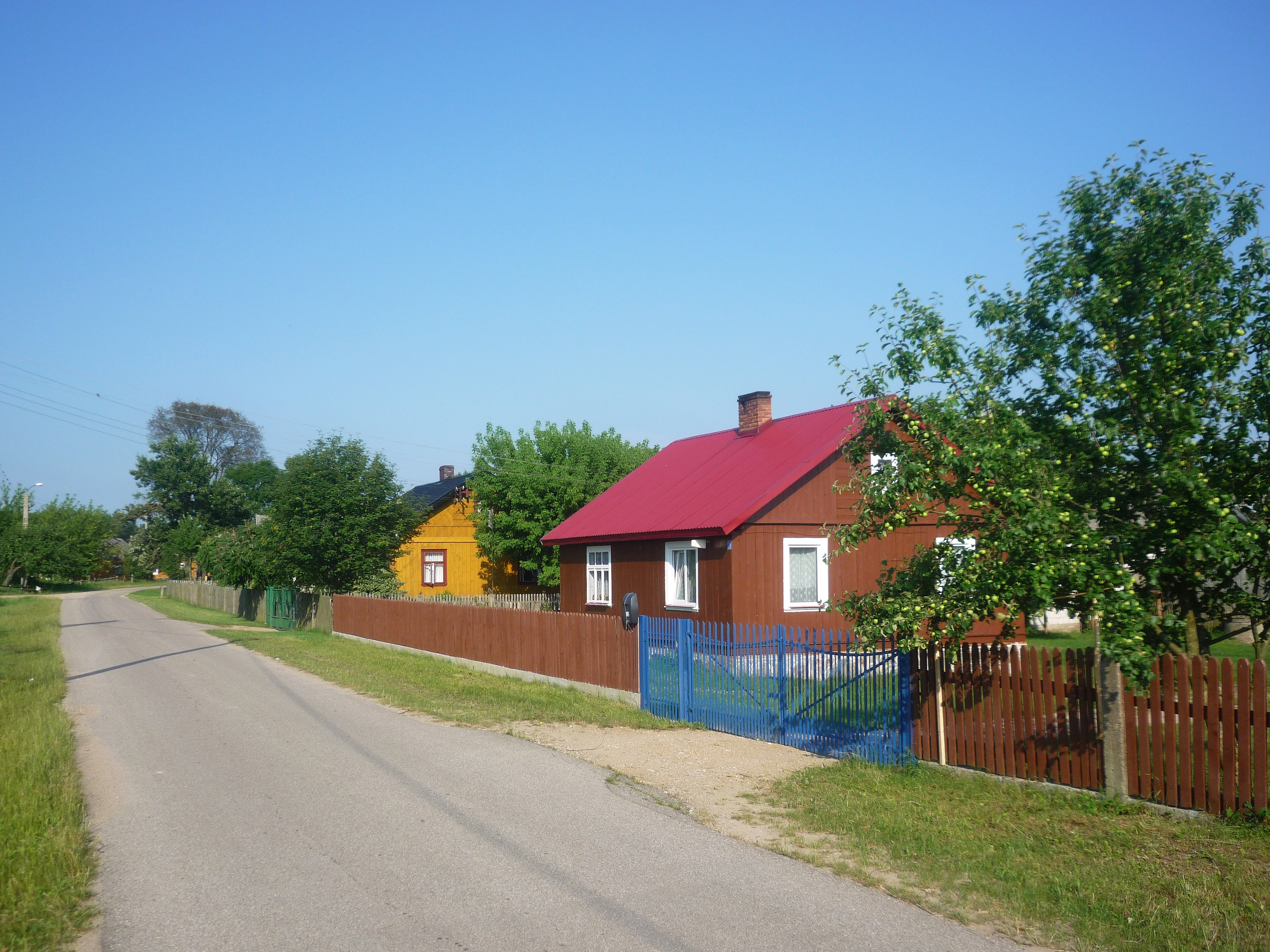

- Location within Poland
- Coordinates: 53°01′39″N 22°25′45″E
- Country: Poland
- Voivodeship: Podlaskie
- County: Zambrów
- Gmina: Kołaki Kościelne

Czarnowo-Undy [t͡ʂarˈnɔvɔ ˈundɨ] is a village in the administrative district of Gmina Kołaki Kościelne, within Zambrów County, Podlaskie Voivodeship, in north-eastern Poland.
