= Zanie-Leśnica =

- Village
- Location within Poland
- Coordinates: 53°02′19″N 22°20′04″E
- Country: Poland
- Voivodeship: Podlaskie
- County: Zambrów
- Gmina: Kołaki Kościelne

Zanie-Leśnica [ˈzaɲɛ lɛɕˈnit͡sa] is a village in the administrative district of Gmina Kołaki Kościelne, within Zambrów County, Podlaskie Voivodeship, in north-eastern Poland.
