= Brajczewo-Sierzputy =

- Village
- Location within Poland
- Coordinates: 52°54′52″N 22°16′59″E
- Country: Poland
- Voivodeship: Podlaskie
- County: Zambrów
- Gmina: Zambrów

Brajczewo-Sierzputy [brai̯ˈt͡ʂɛvɔ ɕɛʂˈputɨ] is a village in the administrative district of Gmina Zambrów, within Zambrów County, Podlaskie Voivodeship, in north-eastern Poland.
