= Ćwikły-Krajewo =

- Village
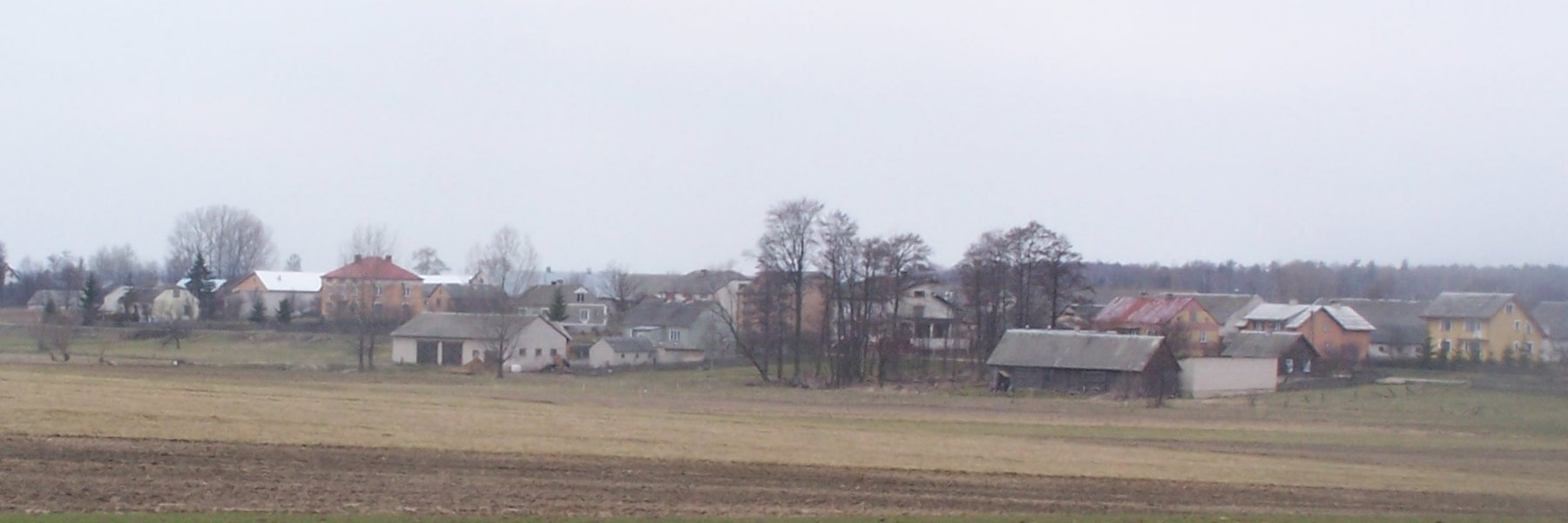

- Location within Poland
- Coordinates: 53°1′N 22°17′E
- Country: Poland
- Voivodeship: Podlaskie
- County: Zambrów
- Gmina: Kołaki Kościelne

Ćwikły-Krajewo [ˈt͡ɕfikwɨ kraˈjɛvɔ] is a village in the administrative district of Gmina Kołaki Kościelne, within Zambrów County, Podlaskie Voivodeship, in north-eastern Poland.
