= Wądołki-Borowe =

- Village
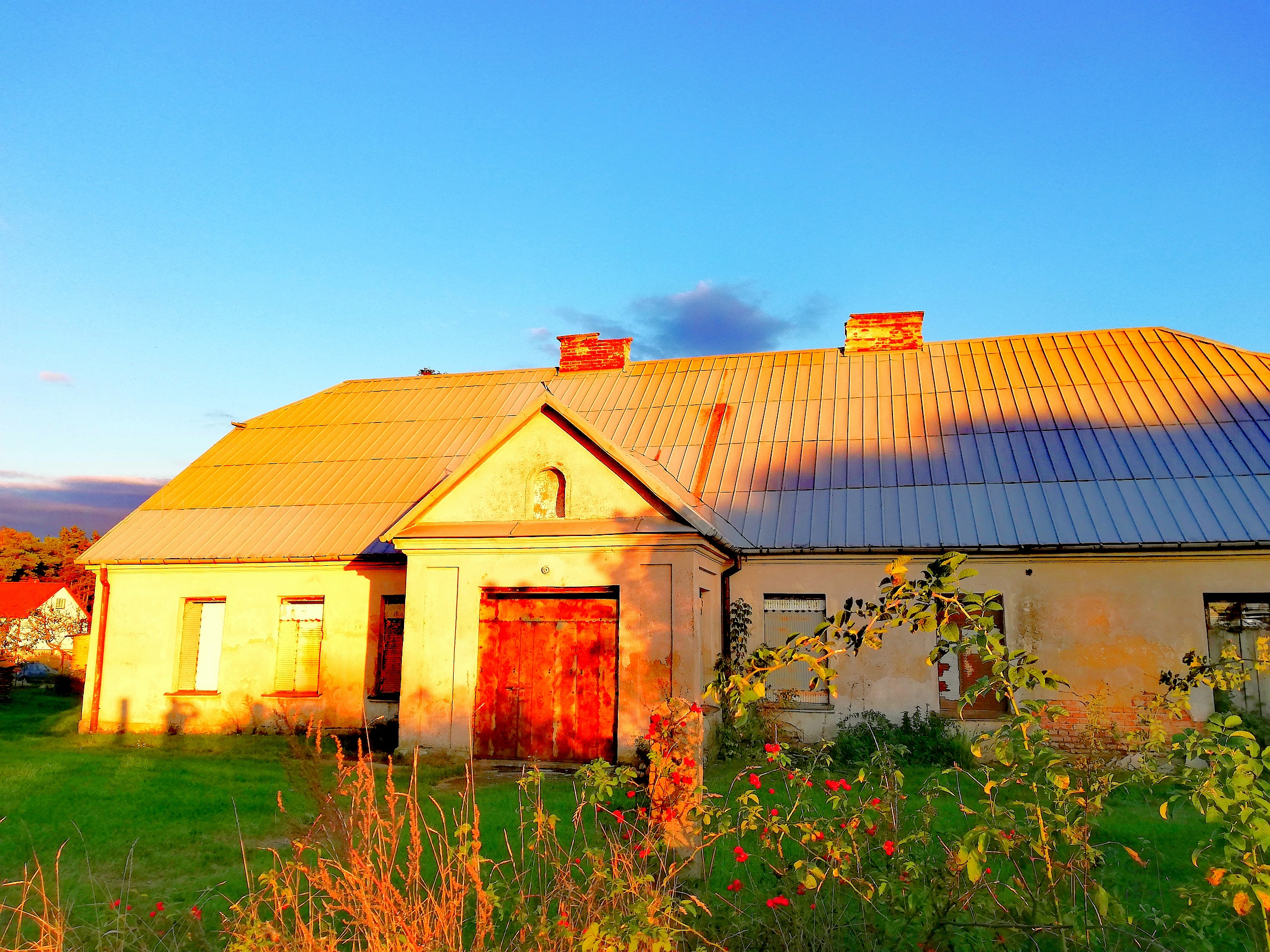

- Location within Poland
- Coordinates: 52°56′23″N 22°12′19″E
- Country: Poland
- Voivodeship: Podlaskie
- County: Zambrów
- Gmina: Zambrów

Wądołki-Borowe [vɔnˈdɔu̯ki bɔˈrɔvɛ] is a village in the administrative district of Gmina Zambrów, within Zambrów County, Podlaskie Voivodeship, in north-eastern Poland.
