= Tabędz =

- Village
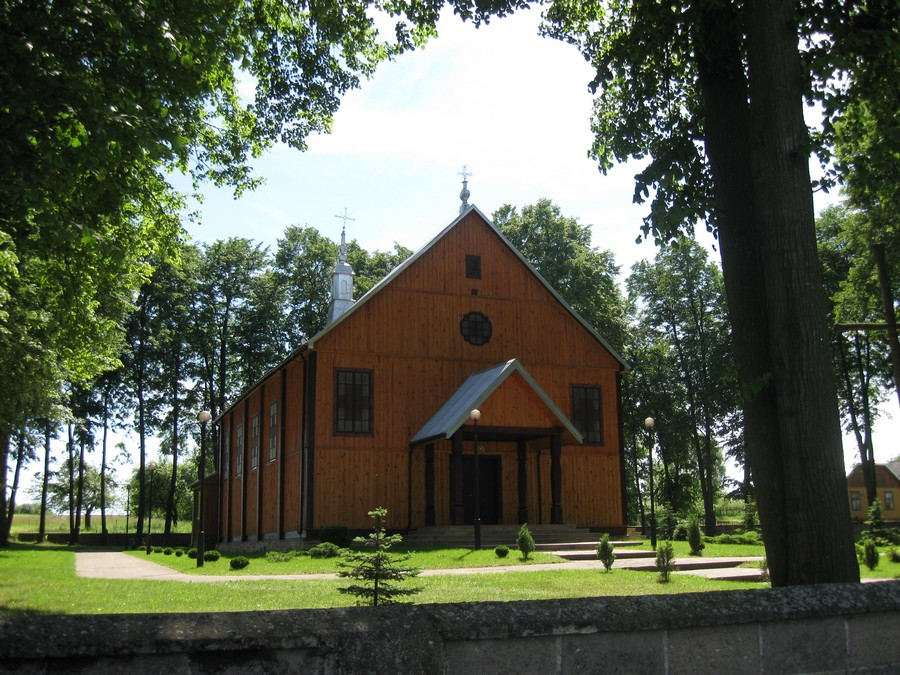
- Parish Church of Our Lady of Częstochowa in Tabędz

- Location within Poland
- Coordinates: 53°00′16″N 22°08′05″E
- Country: Poland
- Voivodeship: Podlaskie
- County: Zambrów
- Gmina: Zambrów

Tabędz [ˈtabɛnt͡s] is a village in the administrative district of Gmina Zambrów, within Zambrów County, Podlaskie Voivodeship, in north-eastern Poland.
