= Nowe Zakrzewo, Podlaskie Voivodeship =

Nowe Zakrzewo
- Village
- Location within Poland
- Coordinates: 52°59′46″N 22°11′35″E
- Country: Poland
- Voivodeship: Podlaskie
- County: Zambrów
- Gmina: Zambrów

Nowe Zakrzewo [ˈnɔvɛ zaˈkʂɛvɔ] is a village in the administrative district of Gmina Zambrów, within Zambrów County, Podlaskie Voivodeship, in north-eastern Poland.
