= Nowy Borek, Podlaskie Voivodeship =

Nowy Borek
- Village
- Location within Poland
- Coordinates: 52°53′52″N 22°12′46″E
- Country: Poland
- Voivodeship: Podlaskie
- County: Zambrów
- Gmina: Zambrów

Nowy Borek [ˈnɔvɨ ˈbɔrɛk] is a village in the administrative district of Gmina Zambrów, within Zambrów County, Podlaskie Voivodeship, in north-eastern Poland.
