= Przeździecko-Mroczki =

- Village
- Location within Poland
- Coordinates: 52°52′57″N 22°15′12″E
- Country: Poland
- Voivodeship: Podlaskie
- County: Zambrów
- Gmina: Zambrów
- Postal code: 18-300
- Vehicle registration: BZA

Przeździecko-Mroczki (Polish pronunciation: [pʂɛʑˈd͡ʑɛt͡skɔ ˈmrɔt͡ʂkʲi]) is a village in the administrative district of Gmina Zambrów, within Zambrów County, Podlaskie Voivodeship, in north-eastern Poland.

One Polish citizen was murdered by Nazi Germany in the village during World War II.
