= Grochy-Łętownica =

Village in Gmina Zambrów, Poland

- Village
- Location within Poland
- Coordinates: 52°53′47″N 22°14′01″E
- Country: Poland
- Voivodeship: Podlaskie
- County: Zambrów
- Gmina: Zambrów
- Population (approx.): 90

Grochy-Łętownica [ˈɡrɔxɨ wɛntɔvˈnit͡sa] is a village in the administrative district of Gmina Zambrów, within Zambrów County, Podlaskie Voivodeship, in north-eastern Poland.
