= Poryte-Jabłoń =

- Village
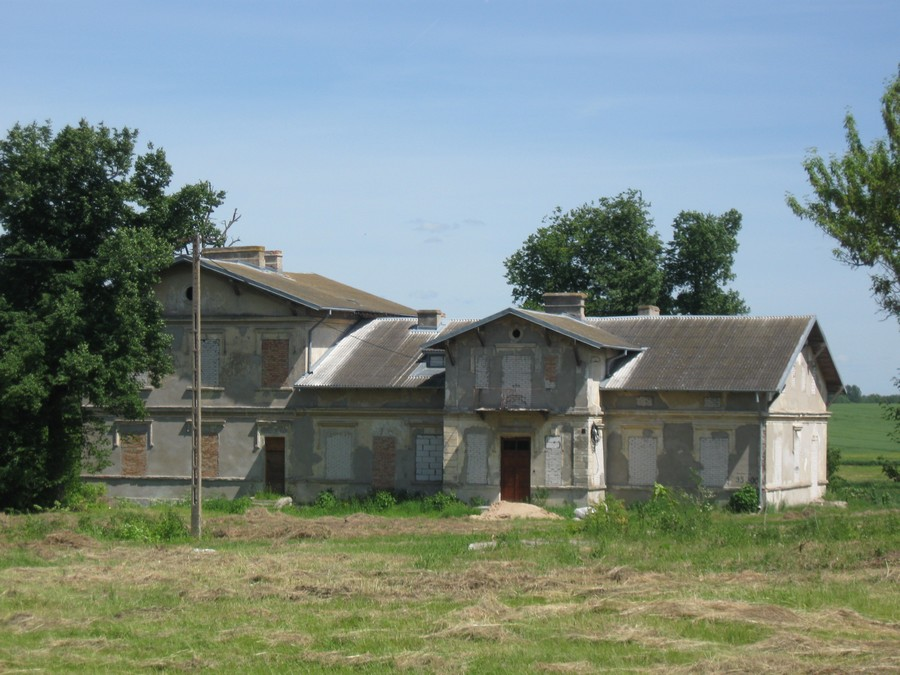

- Location within Poland
- Coordinates: 53°00′50″N 22°12′43″E
- Country: Poland
- Voivodeship: Podlaskie
- County: Zambrów
- Gmina: Zambrów

Poryte-Jabłoń [pɔˈrɨtɛ ˈjabwɔɲ] is a village in the administrative district of Gmina Zambrów, within Zambrów County, Podlaskie Voivodeship, in north-eastern Poland.
