= Zagroby-Zakrzewo =

- Village
- Location within Poland
- Coordinates: 53°00′30″N 22°09′14″E
- Country: Poland
- Voivodeship: Podlaskie
- County: Zambrów
- Gmina: Zambrów

Zagroby-Zakrzewo [zaˈɡrɔbɨ zaˈkʂɛvɔ] is a village in the administrative district of Gmina Zambrów, within Zambrów County, Podlaskie Voivodeship, in north-eastern Poland.
