= Stryjki, Podlaskie Voivodeship =

Stryjki
- Village
- Location within Poland
- Coordinates: 52°54′45″N 22°00′24″E
- Country: Poland
- Voivodeship: Podlaskie
- County: Zambrów
- Gmina: Szumowo

Stryjki [ˈstrɨi̯ki] is a village in the administrative district of Gmina Szumowo, within Zambrów County, Podlaskie Voivodeship, in north-eastern Poland.
