= Bacze Mokre =

- Village
- Location within Poland
- Coordinates: 53°2′13″N 22°8′0″E
- Country: Poland
- Voivodeship: Podlaskie
- County: Zambrów
- Gmina: Zambrów

Bacze Mokre [ˈbat͡ʂɛ ˈmɔkrɛ] is a village in the administrative district of Gmina Zambrów, within Zambrów County, Podlaskie Voivodeship, in north-eastern Poland.
