= Żabikowo =

Żabikowo may refer to the following places in Poland:

- Żabikowo, Gmina Środa Wielkopolska, Środa County
- Żabikowo, Luboń
- Żabikowo Prywatne
- Żabikowo Rządowe
