= Wola Zambrzycka =

- Village
- Location within Poland
- Coordinates: 52°58′44″N 22°16′49″E
- Country: Poland
- Voivodeship: Podlaskie
- County: Zambrów
- Gmina: Zambrów

Wola Zambrzycka [ˈvɔla zamˈbʐɨt͡ska] is a village in the administrative district of Gmina Zambrów, within Zambrów County, Podlaskie Voivodeship, in north-eastern Poland.
