= Czachy-Kołaki =

- Village
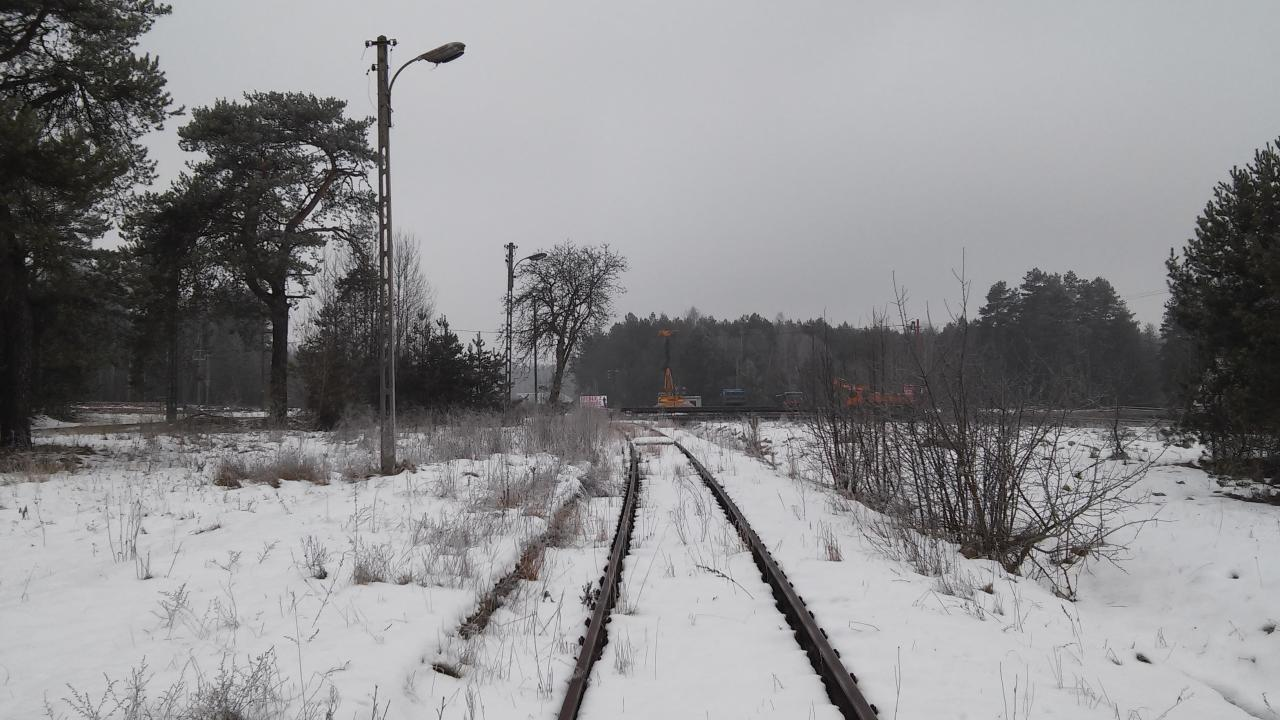
- Kołaki train stop

- Location within Poland
- Coordinates: 53°3′N 22°23′E
- Country: Poland
- Voivodeship: Podlaskie
- County: Zambrów
- Gmina: Kołaki Kościelne

Czachy-Kołaki [ˈt͡ʂaxɨ kɔˈwaki] is a village in the administrative district of Gmina Kołaki Kościelne, within Zambrów County, Podlaskie Voivodeship, in north-eastern Poland.
