= Zaręby-Kramki =

- Village
- Location within Poland
- Coordinates: 52°53′15″N 22°18′21″E
- Country: Poland
- Voivodeship: Podlaskie
- County: Zambrów
- Gmina: Zambrów

Zaręby-Kramki [zaˈrɛmbɨ ˈkramki] is a village in the administrative district of Gmina Zambrów, within Zambrów County, Podlaskie Voivodeship, in north-eastern Poland.
