= Sędziwuje =

Village in Gmina Zambrów, Poland

- Village
- Location within Poland
- Coordinates: 52°58′31″N 22°12′26″E
- Country: Poland
- Voivodeship: Podlaskie
- County: Zambrów
- Gmina: Zambrów
- Postal code: 18-300
- Vehicle registration: BZA

Sędziwuje [sɛnd͡ʑiˈvujɛ] is a village in the administrative district of Gmina Zambrów, within Zambrów County, Podlaskie Voivodeship, in north-eastern Poland.

Five Polish citizens were murdered by Nazi Germany in the village during World War II.
