= Klimasze =

- Village
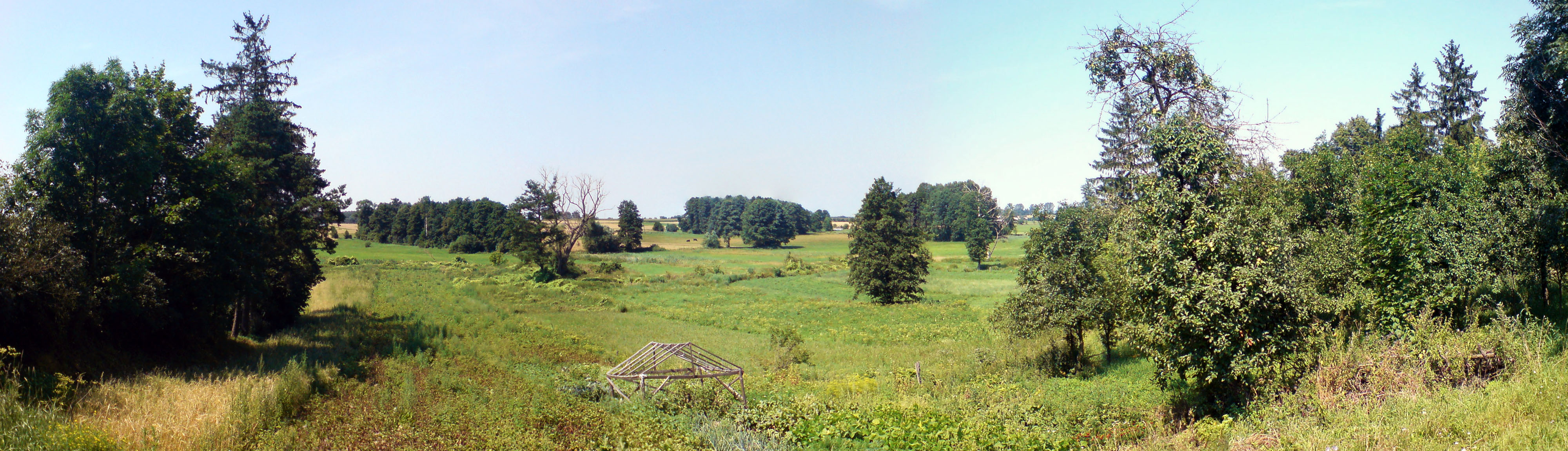

- Location within Poland
- Coordinates: 53°00′08″N 22°13′23″E
- Country: Poland
- Voivodeship: Podlaskie
- County: Zambrów
- Gmina: Zambrów

Klimasze [kliˈmaʂɛ] is a village in the administrative district of Gmina Zambrów, within Zambrów County, Podlaskie Voivodeship, in north-eastern Poland.
