= Zaręby-Krztęki =

- Village
- Location within Poland
- Coordinates: 52°53′54″N 22°20′00″E
- Country: Poland
- Voivodeship: Podlaskie
- County: Zambrów
- Gmina: Zambrów

Zaręby-Krztęki [zaˈrɛmbɨ ˈkʂtɛŋki] is a village in the administrative district of Gmina Zambrów, within Zambrów County, Podlaskie Voivodeship, in north-eastern Poland.
