= Krajewo-Korytki =

- Village
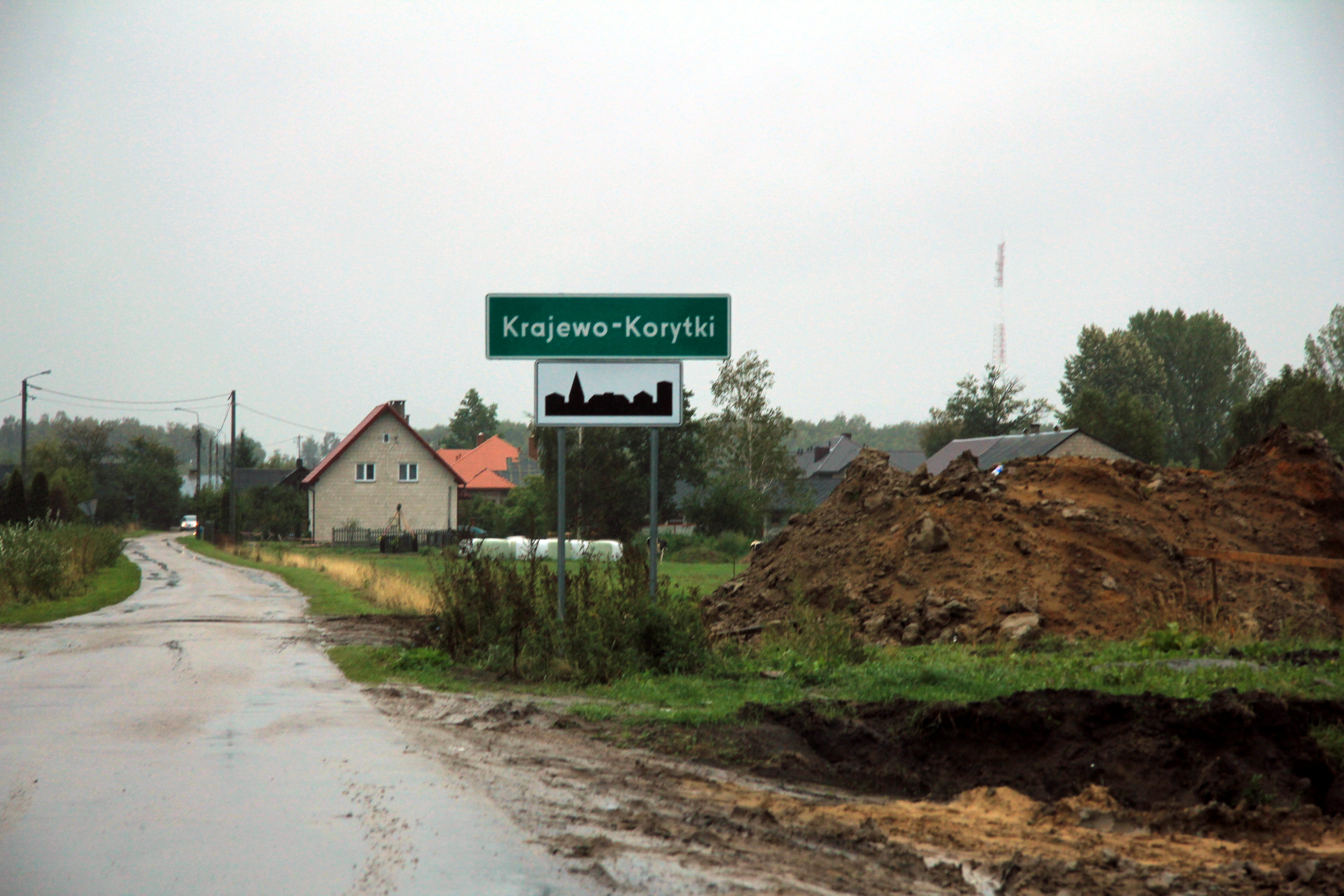

- Location within Poland
- Coordinates: 52°56′58″N 22°10′53″E
- Country: Poland
- Voivodeship: Podlaskie
- County: Zambrów
- Gmina: Zambrów

Krajewo-Korytki [kraˈjɛvɔ kɔˈrɨtki] is a village in the administrative district of Gmina Zambrów, within Zambrów County, Podlaskie Voivodeship, in north-eastern Poland.
