= Pstrągi-Gniewoty =

Village in Gmina Zambrów, Poland

- Village
- Location within Poland
- Coordinates: 53°01′08″N 22°08′23″E
- Country: Poland
- Voivodeship: Podlaskie
- County: Zambrów
- Gmina: Zambrów

Pstrągi-Gniewoty [ˈpstrɔŋɡi ɡɲɛˈvɔtɨ] is a village in the administrative district of Gmina Zambrów, within Zambrów County, Podlaskie Voivodeship, in north-eastern Poland.
