= Zaręby-Świeżki =

- Village
- Location within Poland
- Coordinates: 52°54′44″N 22°20′21″E
- Country: Poland
- Voivodeship: Podlaskie
- County: Zambrów
- Gmina: Zambrów

Zaręby-Świeżki (Polish pronunciation: [zaˈrɛmbɨ ˈɕfjɛʂkʲi]) is a village in the administrative district of Gmina Zambrów, within Zambrów County, Podlaskie Voivodeship, in north-eastern Poland.
