= Paproć Duża =

- Village
- Location within Poland
- Coordinates: 52°52′N 22°8′E
- Country: Poland
- Voivodeship: Podlaskie
- County: Zambrów
- Gmina: Szumowo
- Population: 460

Paproć Duża [ˈpaprɔt͡ɕ ˈduʐa] is a village in the administrative district of Gmina Szumowo, within Zambrów County, Podlaskie Voivodeship, in north-eastern Poland.
