= Krajewo-Ćwikły =

- Village
- Location within Poland
- Coordinates: 52°59′08″N 22°09′34″E
- Country: Poland
- Voivodeship: Podlaskie
- County: Zambrów
- Gmina: Zambrów

Krajewo-Ćwikły [kraˈjɛvɔ ˈt͡ɕfikwɨ] is a village in the administrative district of Gmina Zambrów, within Zambrów County, Podlaskie Voivodeship, in northeastern Poland.
