= Nowe Wierzbowo =

- Village
- Location within Poland
- Coordinates: 52°59′03″N 22°19′15″E
- Country: Poland
- Voivodeship: Podlaskie
- County: Zambrów
- Gmina: Zambrów

Nowe Wierzbowo [ˈnɔvɛ vjɛʐˈbɔvɔ] is a village in the administrative district of Gmina Zambrów, within Zambrów County, Podlaskie Voivodeship, in north-eastern Poland.
