= Głębocz Wielki =

- Village
- Location within Poland
- Coordinates: 52°58′N 22°03′E
- Country: Poland
- Voivodeship: Podlaskie
- County: Zambrów
- Gmina: Szumowo
- Time zone: UTC+1 (CET)
  - Summer (DST): UTC+2 (CEST)

Głębocz Wielki (Polish pronunciation: [ˈɡwɛmbɔtʂ ˈfjɛlkʲi]) is a village in the administrative district of Gmina Szumowo, within Zambrów County, Podlaskie Voivodeship, in north-eastern Poland.

== History ==
Three Polish citizens were murdered by Nazi Germany in the village during World War II.
