= Nowy Laskowiec =

- Village
- Location within Poland
- Coordinates: 52°56′39″N 22°18′29″E
- Country: Poland
- Voivodeship: Podlaskie
- County: Zambrów
- Gmina: Zambrów

Nowy Laskowiec [ˈnɔvɨ lasˈkɔvjɛt͡s] is a village in the administrative district of Gmina Zambrów, within Zambrów County, Podlaskie Voivodeship, in north-eastern Poland.
