= Cieciorki =

- Village
- Location within Poland
- Coordinates: 53°2′N 22°16′E
- Country: Poland
- Voivodeship: Podlaskie
- County: Zambrów
- Gmina: Zambrów

Cieciorki [t͡ɕɛˈt͡ɕɔrki] is a village in the administrative district of Gmina Zambrów, within Zambrów County, Podlaskie Voivodeship, in north-eastern Poland.
