= Kossaki-Borowe =

- Village
- Location within Poland
- Coordinates: 53°03′04″N 22°23′45″E
- Country: Poland
- Voivodeship: Podlaskie
- County: Zambrów
- Gmina: Kołaki Kościelne

Kossaki-Borowe [kɔsˈsaki bɔˈrɔvɛ] is a village in the administrative district of Gmina Kołaki Kościelne, within Zambrów County, Podlaskie Voivodeship, in north-eastern Poland.
