= Kaczynek =

- Village
- Location within Poland
- Coordinates: 52°58′34″N 22°00′26″E
- Country: Poland
- Voivodeship: Podlaskie
- County: Zambrów
- Gmina: Szumowo

Kaczynek [kaˈt͡ʂɨnɛk] is a village in the administrative district of Gmina Szumowo, within Zambrów County, Podlaskie Voivodeship, in north-eastern Poland.
