= Zbrzeźnica =

- Village
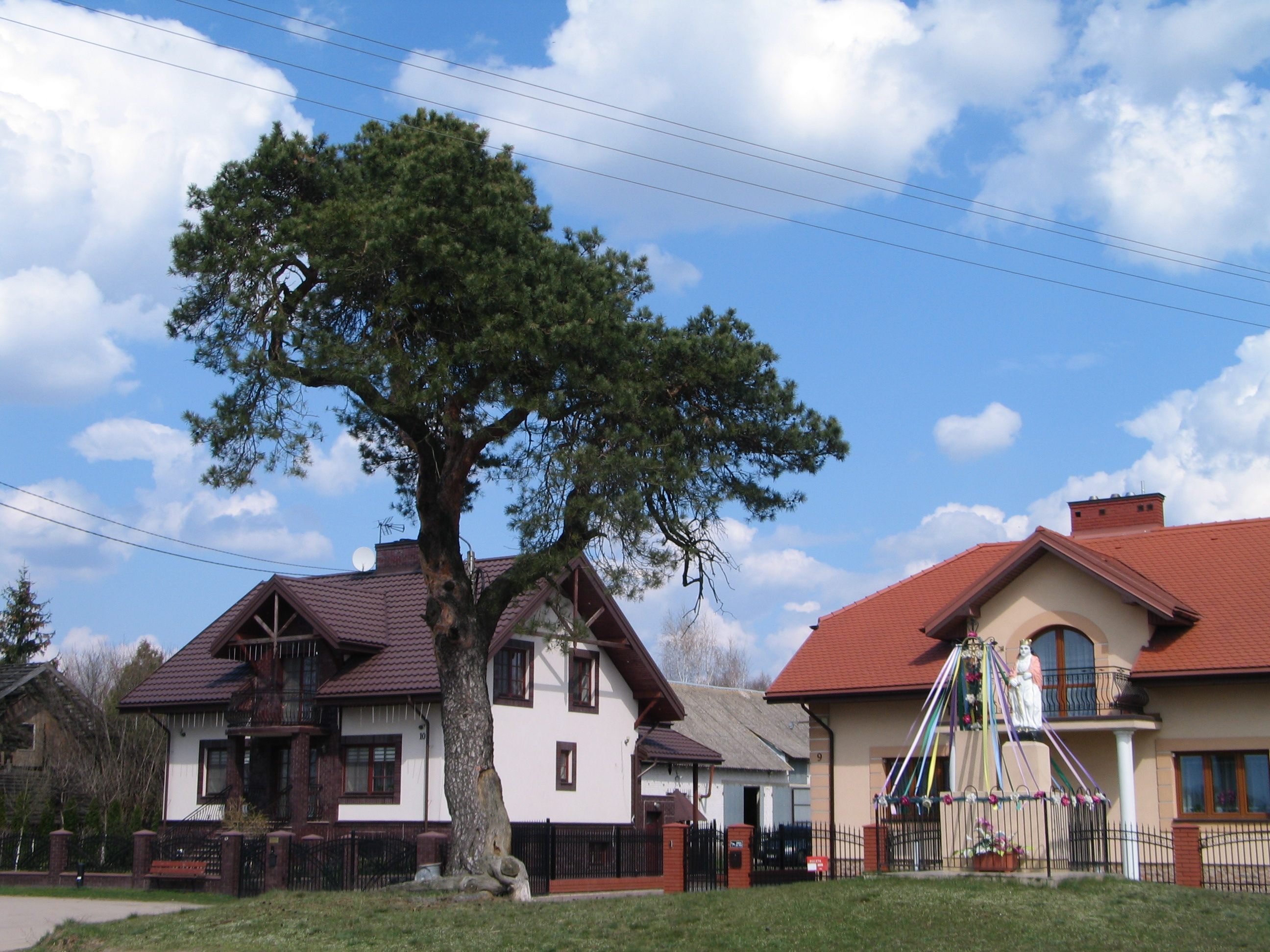

- Location within Poland
- Coordinates: 53°1′32″N 22°10′02″E
- Country: Poland
- Voivodeship: Podlaskie
- County: Zambrów
- Gmina: Zambrów

Zbrzeźnica [zbʐɛʑˈnit͡sa] is a village in the administrative district of Gmina Zambrów, within Zambrów County, Podlaskie Voivodeship, in north-eastern Poland.

Four Polish citizens were murdered by Nazi Germany in the village during World War II.
