= Stare Krajewo =

- Village
- Location within Poland
- Coordinates: 52°58′36″N 22°10′35″E
- Country: Poland
- Voivodeship: Podlaskie
- County: Zambrów
- Gmina: Zambrów

Stare Krajewo [ˈstarɛ kraˈjɛvɔ] is a village in the administrative district of Gmina Zambrów, within Zambrów County, Podlaskie Voivodeship, in north-eastern Poland.
