= Cholewy-Kołomyja =

Village in Gmina Kołaki Kościelne, Poland

- Village
- Location within Poland
- Coordinates: 53°03′42″N 22°22′10″E
- Country: Poland
- Voivodeship: Podlaskie
- County: Zambrów
- Gmina: Kołaki Kościelne

Cholewy-Kołomyja [xɔˈlɛvɨ kɔwɔˈmɨja] is a village in the administrative district of Gmina Kołaki Kościelne, within Zambrów County, Podlaskie Voivodeship, in north-eastern Poland.
