= Radwany-Zaorze =

- Village
- Location within Poland
- Coordinates: 52°54′01″N 22°01′39″E
- Country: Poland
- Voivodeship: Podlaskie
- County: Zambrów
- Gmina: Szumowo

Radwany-Zaorze (Polish pronunciation: [raˈdvanɨ zaˈɔʐɛ]) is a village in the administrative district of Gmina Szumowo, within Zambrów County, Podlaskie Voivodeship, in north-eastern Poland.
