= Gunie-Ostrów =

- Village
- Location within Poland
- Coordinates: 53°0′40″N 22°23′20″E
- Country: Poland
- Voivodeship: Podlaskie
- County: Zambrów
- Gmina: Kołaki Kościelne
- Population: 100

Gunie-Ostrów [ˈɡuɲɛ ˈɔstruf] is a village in the administrative district of Gmina Kołaki Kościelne, within Zambrów County, Podlaskie Voivodeship, in north-eastern Poland.
