= Stare Wądołki =

- Village
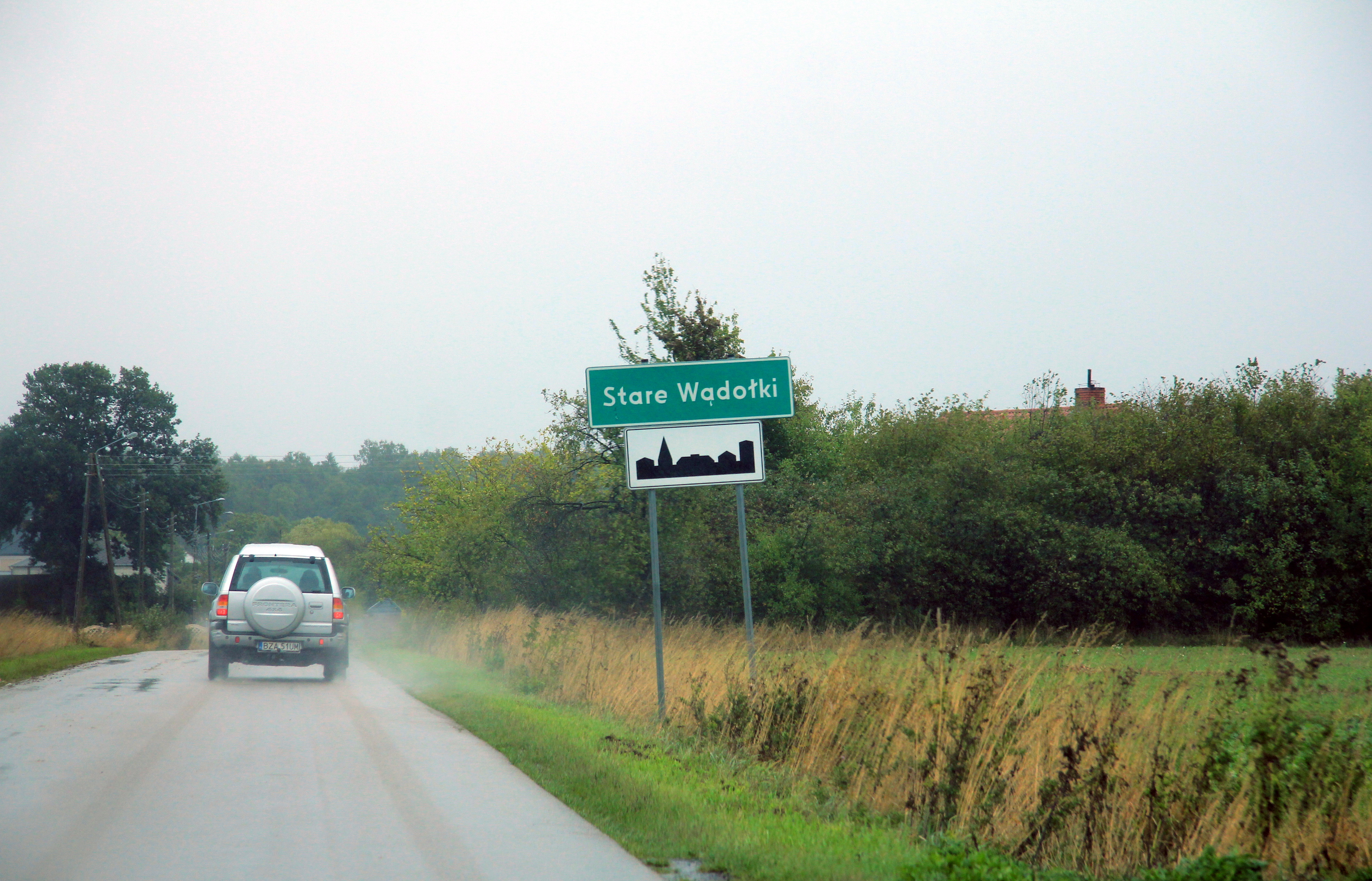

- Location within Poland
- Coordinates: 52°57′19″N 22°13′04″E
- Country: Poland
- Voivodeship: Podlaskie
- County: Zambrów
- Gmina: Zambrów

Stare Wądołki [ˈstarɛ vɔnˈdɔu̯ki] is a village in the administrative district of Gmina Zambrów, within Zambrów County, Podlaskie Voivodeship, in north-eastern Poland.
