= Koziki-Jałbrzyków Stok =

Village in Gmina Zambrów, Poland

- Village
- Location within Poland
- Coordinates: 53°02′01″N 22°15′11″E
- Country: Poland
- Voivodeship: Podlaskie
- County: Zambrów
- Gmina: Zambrów

Koziki-Jałbrzyków Stok [kɔˈʑiki jau̯ˈbʐɨkuf ˈstɔk] is a village in the administrative district of Gmina Zambrów, within Zambrów County, Podlaskie Voivodeship, in north-eastern Poland.
