= Rębiszewo-Studzianki =

- Village
- Location within Poland
- Coordinates: 52°58′11″N 22°21′26″E
- Country: Poland
- Voivodeship: Podlaskie
- County: Wysokie Mazowieckie
- Gmina: Wysokie Mazowieckie
- Population: 86

Rębiszewo-Studzianki [rɛmbiˈʂɛvɔ stuˈd͡ʑaŋki] is a village in the administrative district of Gmina Wysokie Mazowieckie, within Wysokie Mazowieckie County, Podlaskie Voivodeship, in north-eastern Poland.

== History ==
A court document from 1472 mentions three settlements: Rembiszewo Studzianki, Rembiszewo Żegadły, and Rembiszewo Rzębiki.

During the Polish–Lithuanian Commonwealth, the village belonged to the Łomża Land.

In 1827, the village had 15 houses and 96 inhabitants, while Rembiszewo Żegadły had 11 houses and 80 inhabitants.

At the end of the 19th century, Rembiszewo Studzianki was a village in Łomża County, Kossaki Gmina, and the Kołaki Kościelne parish. Some of its inhabitants belonged to the szlachta (Polish nobility).

From 1921 to 1925, the village was located in the Białystok Voivodeship, Łomża County, and Kossaki-Rutki Gmina; from 1925, it was part of Kołaki Gmina. In the 1921 census, it had 20 residential buildings and one other inhabited building, with a population of 97 (46 men and 51 women). All inhabitants declared Polish nationality and Roman Catholic faith. The village belonged to the Roman Catholic parish in Jabłonka Kościelna. It was under the jurisdiction of the Zambrów Municipal Court and the Łomża District Court, while the relevant post office was located in Jabłonka Kościelna.

Following the Soviet invasion of Poland in September 1939, the village came under Soviet occupation. From June 1941, it was under German occupation. From 22 July 1941 until 1945, it was incorporated into Landkreis Lomscha, Bezirk Bialystok, within Nazi Germany.

From 1975 to 1998, Rembiszewo Studzianki administratively belonged to the Łomża Voivodeship.

== See also ==
- Mroczki-Rębiszewo
- Rębiszewo-Zegadły
- Studzianki, for other places with this name
