= Wądołki-Bućki =

- Village
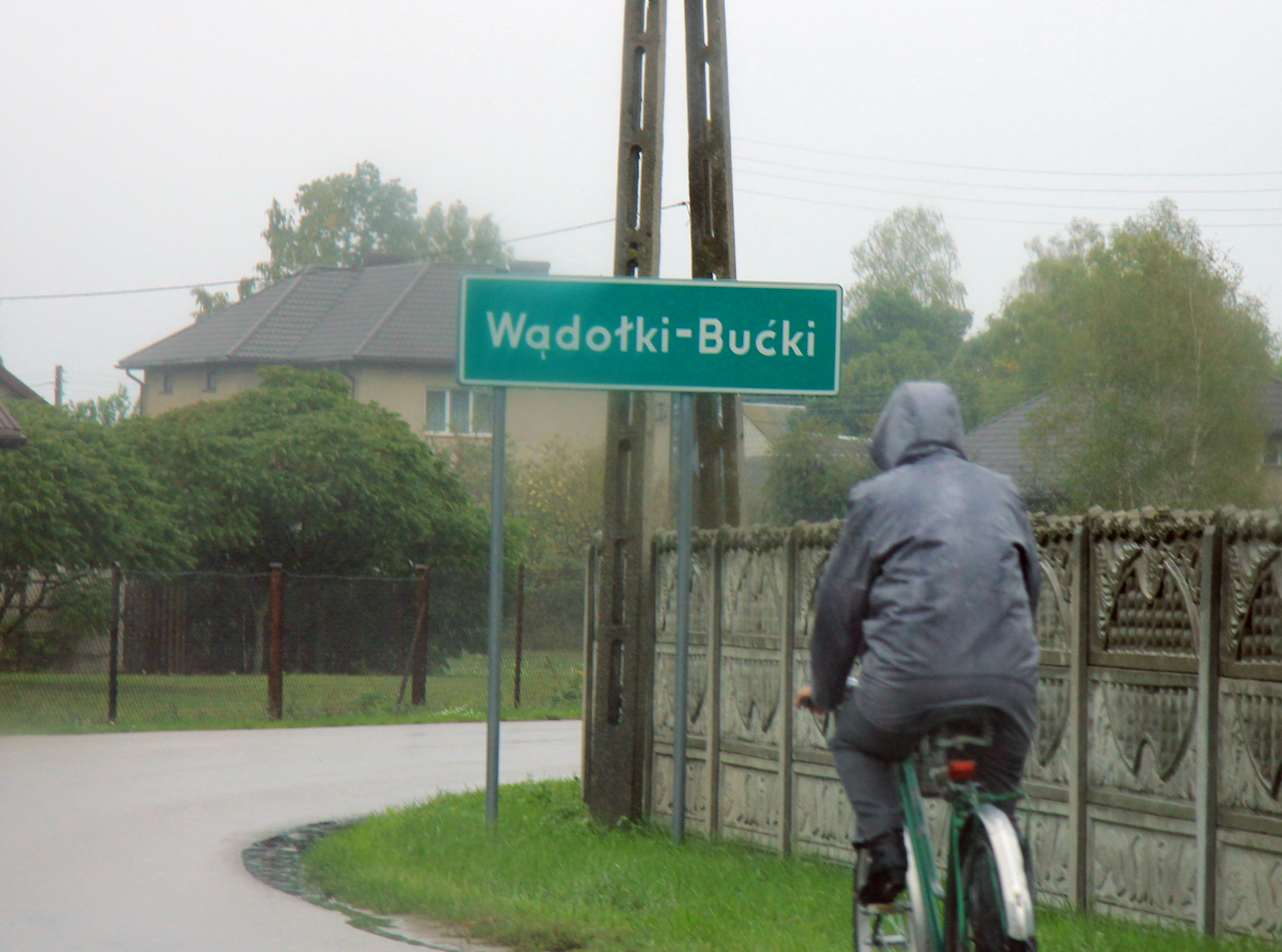

- Location within Poland
- Coordinates: 52°57′33″N 22°13′39″E
- Country: Poland
- Voivodeship: Podlaskie
- County: Zambrów
- Gmina: Zambrów

Wądołki-Bućki [vɔnˈdɔu̯ki ˈbut͡ɕki] is a village in the administrative district of Gmina Zambrów, within Zambrów County, Podlaskie Voivodeship, in north-eastern Poland.
