= Wdziękoń Pierwszy =

- Village
- Location within Poland
- Coordinates: 52°57′47″N 22°18′51″E
- Country: Poland
- Voivodeship: Podlaskie
- County: Zambrów
- Gmina: Zambrów

Wdziękoń Pierwszy [ˈvd͡ʑɛŋkɔɲ ˈpjɛrfʂɨ] is a village in the administrative district of Gmina Zambrów, within Zambrów County, Podlaskie Voivodeship, in north-eastern Poland.
