= Ćwikły-Rupie =

- Village
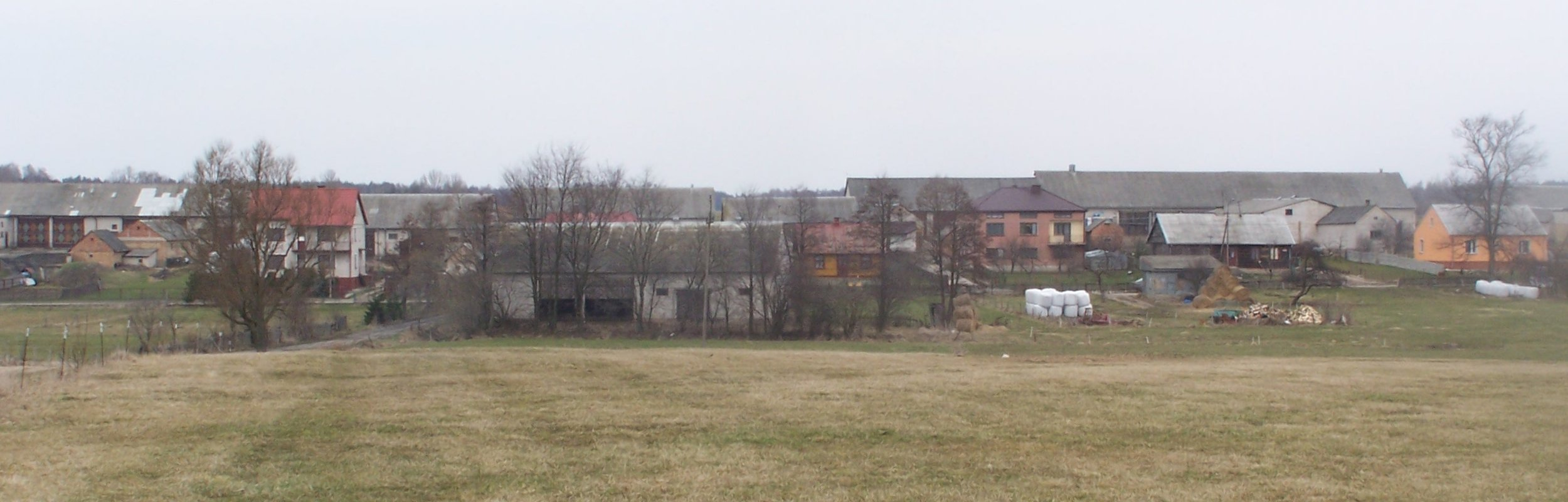

- Location within Poland
- Coordinates: 53°0′41″N 22°19′30″E
- Country: Poland
- Voivodeship: Podlaskie
- County: Zambrów
- Gmina: Kołaki Kościelne

Ćwikły-Rupie [ˈt͡ɕfikwɨ ˈrupjɛ] is a village in the administrative district of Gmina Kołaki Kościelne, within Zambrów County, Podlaskie Voivodeship, in north-eastern Poland.
