= Krajewo Białe =

- Village
- Location within Poland
- Coordinates: 52°56′32″N 22°20′14″E
- Country: Poland
- Voivodeship: Podlaskie
- County: Zambrów
- Gmina: Zambrów
- Population (2006): 160
- Post Code: 18-301
- Area Code: (+48) 86
- Vehicle registration: BZA

Krajewo Białe [kraˈjɛvɔ ˈbjawɛ] is a village in the administrative district of Gmina Zambrów, within Zambrów County, Podlaskie Voivodeship, in north-eastern Poland.
