= Konopki-Jabłoń =

Village in Gmina Zambrów, Poland

- Village
- Location within Poland
- Coordinates: 53°00′51″N 22°14′36″E
- Country: Poland
- Voivodeship: Podlaskie
- County: Zambrów
- Gmina: Zambrów

Konopki-Jabłoń [kɔˈnɔpki ˈjabwɔɲ] is a village in the administrative district of Gmina Zambrów, within Zambrów County, Podlaskie Voivodeship, in north-eastern Poland.
