= Podłatki Duże =

- Village
- Location within Poland
- Coordinates: 53°3′N 22°18′E
- Country: Poland
- Voivodeship: Podlaskie
- County: Zambrów
- Gmina: Kołaki Kościelne

Podłatki Duże [pɔdˈwatki ˈduʐɛ] is a village in the administrative district of Gmina Kołaki Kościelne, within Zambrów County, Podlaskie Voivodeship, in north-eastern Poland.
