= Zaręby-Grzymały =

- Village
- Location within Poland
- Coordinates: 52°53′05″N 22°17′27″E
- Country: Poland
- Voivodeship: Podlaskie
- County: Zambrów
- Gmina: Zambrów

Zaręby-Grzymały [zaˈrɛmbɨ ɡʐɨˈmawɨ] is a village in the administrative district of Gmina Zambrów, within Zambrów County, Podlaskie Voivodeship, in north-eastern Poland.
