= Wyszomierz Wielki =

- Village
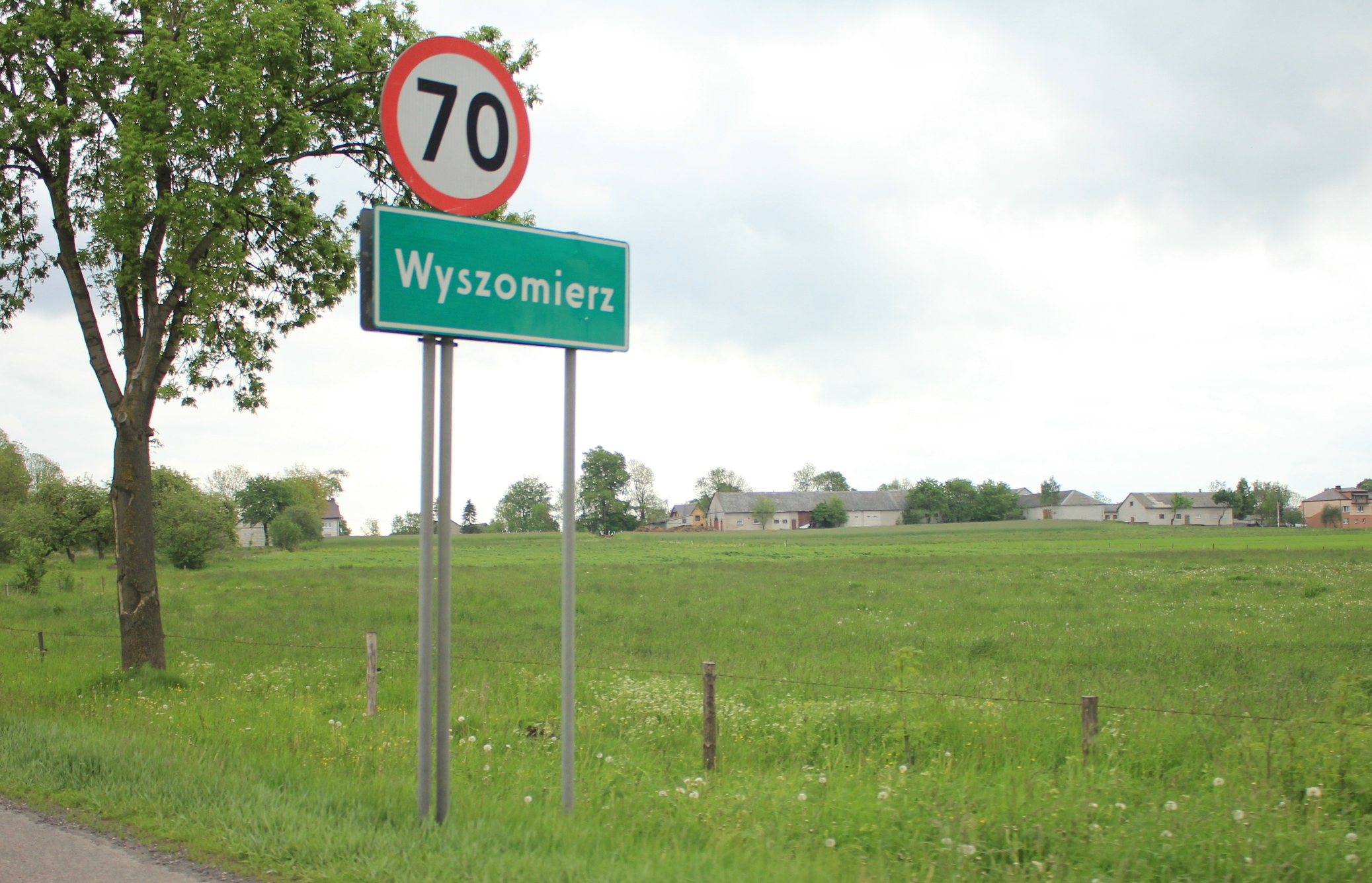

- Location within Poland
- Coordinates: 52°53′15″N 22°3′33″E
- Country: Poland
- Voivodeship: Podlaskie
- County: Zambrów
- Gmina: Szumowo

Wyszomierz Wielki (Polish pronunciation: [vɨˈʂɔmjɛʐ ˈvjɛlkʲi]) is a village in the administrative district of Gmina Szumowo, within Zambrów County, Podlaskie Voivodeship, in north-eastern Poland.
