= Polki-Teklin =

- Village
- Location within Poland
- Coordinates: 53°3′N 22°12′E
- Country: Poland
- Voivodeship: Podlaskie
- County: Zambrów
- Gmina: Zambrów

Polki-Teklin [ˈpɔlki ˈtɛklin] is a village in the administrative district of Gmina Zambrów, within Zambrów County, Podlaskie Voivodeship, in north-eastern Poland.
