= Zaręby-Kromki =

- Village
- Location within Poland
- Coordinates: 52°54′26″N 22°20′02″E
- Country: Poland
- Voivodeship: Podlaskie
- County: Zambrów
- Gmina: Zambrów

Zaręby-Kromki [zaˈrɛmbɨ ˈkrɔmki] is a village in the administrative district of Gmina Zambrów, within Zambrów County, Podlaskie Voivodeship, in north-eastern Poland.
