= Dąbki-Łętownica =

Village in Gmina Zambrów, Poland

- Village
- Location within Poland
- Coordinates: 52°54′37″N 22°13′16″E
- Country: Poland
- Voivodeship: Podlaskie
- County: Zambrów
- Gmina: Zambrów

Dąbki-Łętownica [ˈdɔmpki wɛntɔvˈnit͡sa] is a village in the administrative district of Gmina Zambrów, within Zambrów County, Podlaskie Voivodeship, in north-eastern Poland.
