= Krajewo-Łętowo =

Village in Gmina Zambrów, Poland

- Village
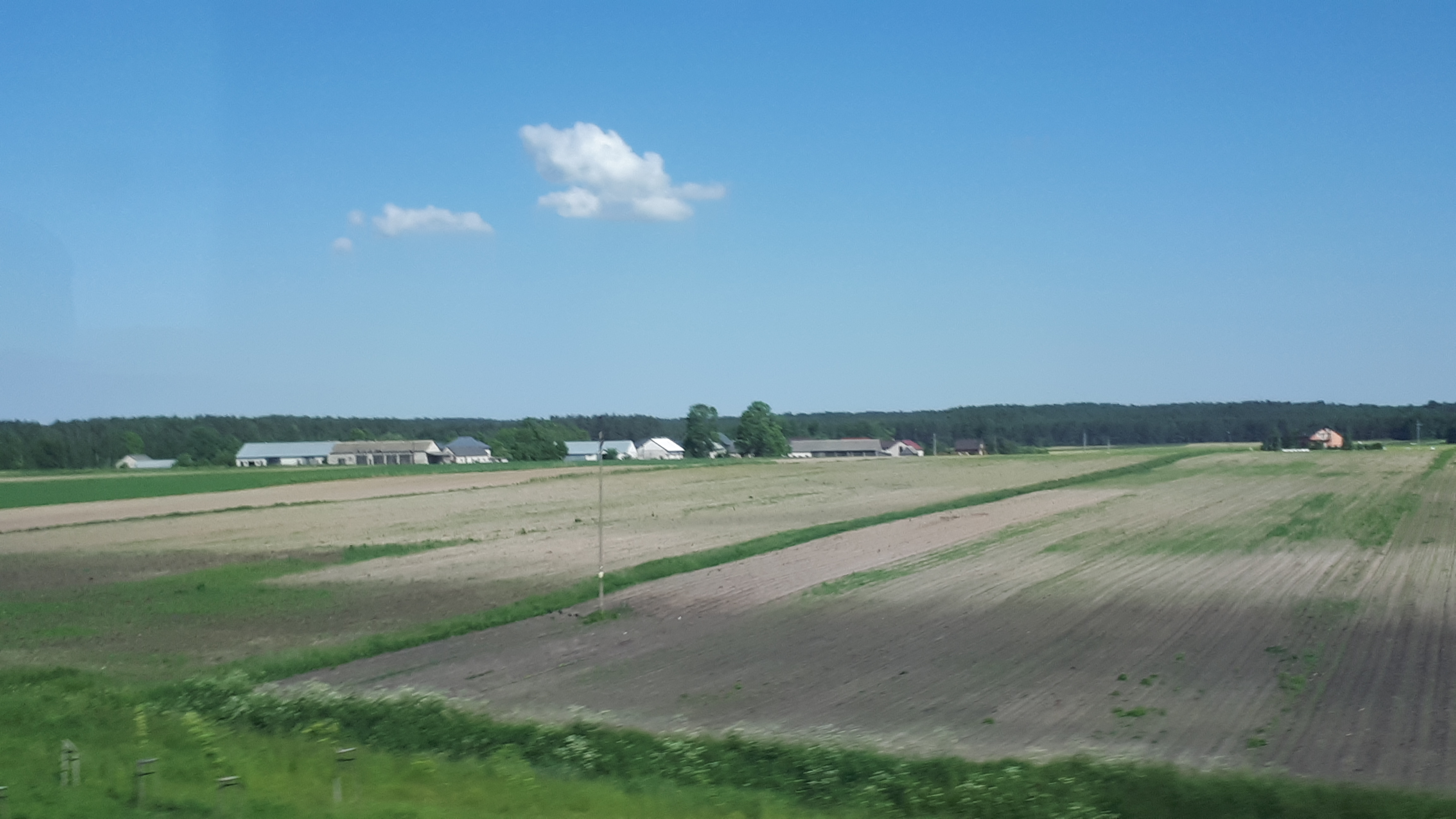

- Location within Poland
- Coordinates: 52°57′24″N 22°09′53″E
- Country: Poland
- Voivodeship: Podlaskie
- County: Zambrów
- Gmina: Zambrów

Krajewo-Łętowo [kraˈjɛvɔ wɛnˈtɔvɔ] is a village in the administrative district of Gmina Zambrów, within Zambrów County, Podlaskie Voivodeship, in north-eastern Poland.
