= Pęchratka Polska =

- Village
- Location within Poland
- Coordinates: 52°51′53″N 22°04′29″E
- Country: Poland
- Voivodeship: Podlaskie
- County: Zambrów
- Gmina: Szumowo

Pęchratka Polska [pɛ̃ˈxratka ˈpɔlska] is a village in the administrative district of Gmina Szumowo, within Zambrów County, Podlaskie Voivodeship, in north-eastern Poland.
