= Kalinowo, Zambrów County =

Kalinowo
- Village
- Location within Poland
- Coordinates: 52°54′46″N 22°08′29″E
- Country: Poland
- Voivodeship: Podlaskie
- County: Zambrów
- Gmina: Szumowo

Kalinowo [kaliˈnɔvɔ] is a village in the administrative district of Gmina Szumowo, within Zambrów County, Podlaskie Voivodeship, in north-eastern Poland.
