= Srebrny Borek =

- Village
- Location within Poland
- Coordinates: 52°54′25″N 22°11′01″E
- Country: Poland
- Voivodeship: Podlaskie
- County: Zambrów
- Gmina: Szumowo
- Time zone: UTC+1 (CET)
  - Summer (DST): UTC+2 (CEST)
- Vehicle registration: BZA

Srebrny Borek [ˈsrɛbrnɨ ˈbɔrɛk] is a village in the administrative district of Gmina Szumowo, within Zambrów County, Podlaskie Voivodeship, in north-eastern Poland.

== History ==
During World War II, a battle between the Polish partisans of the Home Army and the German occupiers was fought at Srebrny Borek in October 1943. 19 Polish citizens were murdered by Nazi Germany in the village during World War II.
