= Konopki-Jałbrzyków Stok =

- Village
- Location within Poland
- Coordinates: 53°2′N 22°15′E
- Country: Poland
- Voivodeship: Podlaskie
- County: Zambrów
- Gmina: Zambrów
- Population: 170

Konopki-Jałbrzyków Stok [kɔˈnɔpki jau̯ˈbʐɨkuf ˈstɔk] is a village in the administrative district of Gmina Zambrów, within Zambrów County, Podlaskie Voivodeship, in north-eastern Poland.
