= Zagroby-Łętownica =

- Village
- Location within Poland
- Coordinates: 52°55′36″N 22°12′12″E
- Country: Poland
- Voivodeship: Podlaskie
- County: Zambrów
- Gmina: Zambrów

Zagroby-Łętownica [zaˈɡrɔbɨ wɛntɔvˈnit͡sa] is a village in the administrative district of Gmina Zambrów, within Zambrów County, Podlaskie Voivodeship, in north-eastern Poland.
