= Srebrna, Podlaskie Voivodeship =

Srebrna
- Village
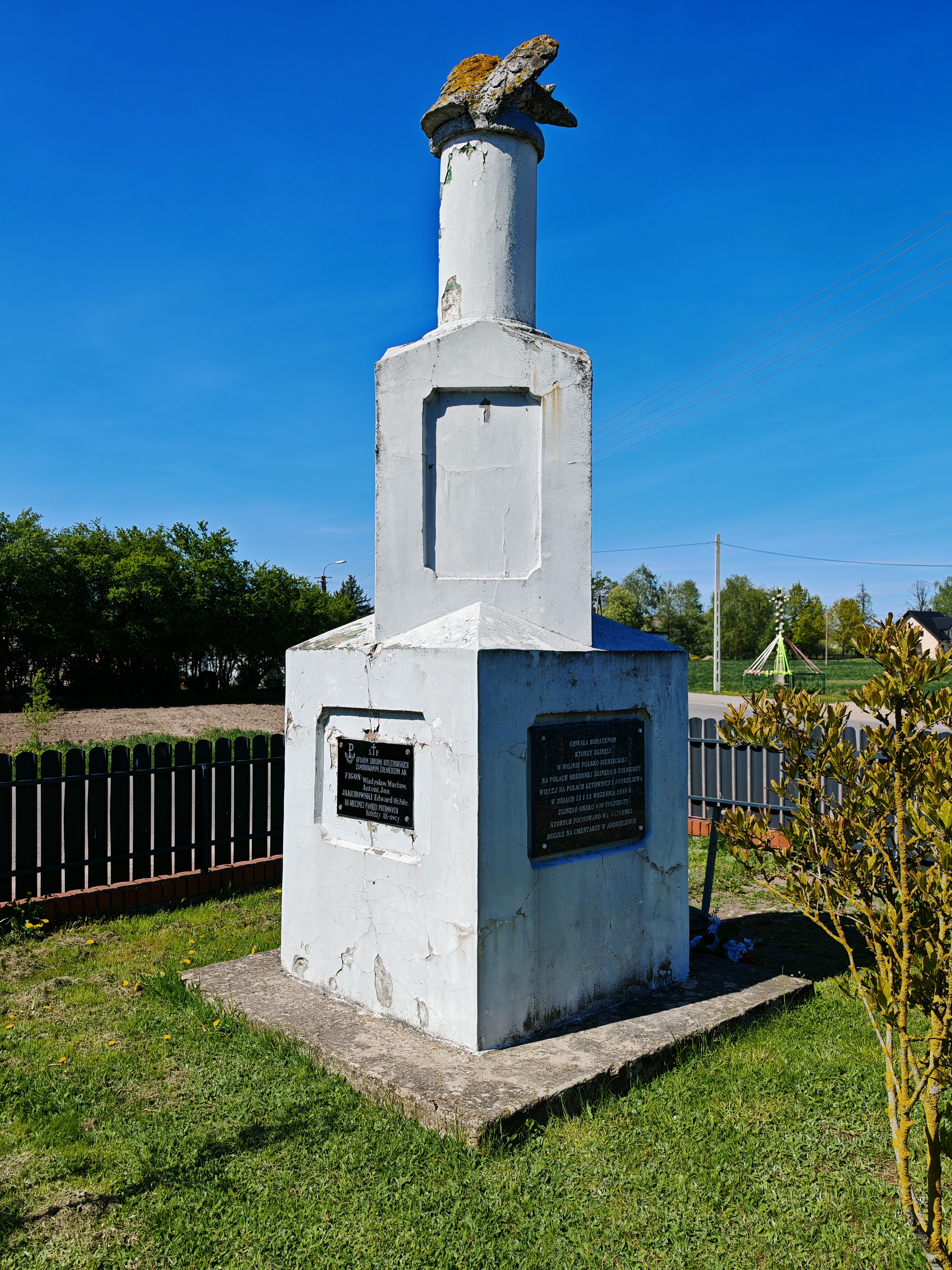
- Monument to victims of German and Russian occupation in World War II

- Location within Poland
- Coordinates: 52°53′10″N 22°8′57″E
- Country: Poland
- Voivodeship: Podlaskie
- County: Zambrów
- Gmina: Szumowo

Population
  - Total: 700
- Time zone: UTC+1 (CET)
  - Summer (DST): UTC+2 (CEST)

Srebrna [ˈsrɛbrna] is a village in the administrative district of Gmina Szumowo, within Zambrów County, Podlaskie Voivodeship, in north-eastern Poland.

== History ==
Three Polish citizens were murdered by Nazi Germany in the village during World War II.
