= Łosie-Dołęgi =

Village in Gmina Zambrów, Poland

- Village
- Location within Poland
- Coordinates: 52°55′36″N 22°17′39″E
- Country: Poland
- Voivodeship: Podlaskie
- County: Zambrów
- Gmina: Zambrów

Łosie-Dołęgi (Polish pronunciation: [ˈwɔɕɛ dɔˈwɛŋɡʲi]) is a village in the administrative district of Gmina Zambrów, within Zambrów County, Podlaskie Voivodeship, in north-eastern Poland.
