= Krajewo-Borowe =

- Village
- Location within Poland
- Coordinates: 52°58′32″N 22°09′26″E
- Country: Poland
- Voivodeship: Podlaskie
- County: Zambrów
- Gmina: Zambrów

Krajewo-Borowe [kraˈjɛvɔ bɔˈrɔvɛ] is a village in the administrative district of Gmina Zambrów, within Zambrów County, Podlaskie Voivodeship, in north-eastern Poland.

== Population ==
As of July 31, 2016, the village had 51 inhabitants (24 houses).
