= Rębiszewo-Zegadły =

- Village
- Location within Poland
- Coordinates: 52°58′30″N 22°21′11″E
- Country: Poland
- Voivodeship: Podlaskie
- County: Zambrów
- Gmina: Kołaki Kościelne

Rębiszewo-Zegadły [rɛmbiˈʂɛvɔ zɛˈɡadwɨ] is a village in the administrative district of Gmina Kołaki Kościelne, within Zambrów County, Podlaskie Voivodeship, in north-eastern Poland.

== See also ==
- Mroczki-Rębiszewo
- Rębiszewo-Studzianki
