= Chorzele, Podlaskie Voivodeship =

Chorzele
- Village
- Location within Poland
- Coordinates: 52°55′N 22°17′E
- Country: Poland
- Voivodeship: Podlaskie
- County: Zambrów
- Gmina: Zambrów
- Postal code: 18-300

Chorzele [xɔˈʐɛlɛ] is a village in the administrative district of Gmina Zambrów, within Zambrów County, Podlaskie Voivodeship, in north-eastern Poland.
