= Wróble-Arciszewo =

- Village
- Location within Poland
- Coordinates: 52°59′31″N 22°19′50″E
- Country: Poland
- Voivodeship: Podlaskie
- County: Zambrów
- Gmina: Kołaki Kościelne

Wróble-Arciszewo [ˈvrublɛ art͡ɕiˈʂɛvɔ] is a village in the administrative district of Gmina Kołaki Kościelne, within Zambrów County, Podlaskie Voivodeship, in north-eastern Poland.
