= Gosie Duże =

- Village
- Location within Poland
- Coordinates: 53°3′N 22°20′E
- Country: Poland
- Voivodeship: Podlaskie
- County: Zambrów
- Gmina: Kołaki Kościelne
- Population: 120

Gosie Duże [ˈɡɔɕɛ ˈduʐɛ] is a village in the administrative district of Gmina Kołaki Kościelne, within Zambrów County, Podlaskie Voivodeship, in north-eastern Poland.
