= Śledzie, Podlaskie Voivodeship =

Śledzie
- Village
- Location within Poland
- Coordinates: 53°1′N 22°11′E
- Country: Poland
- Voivodeship: Podlaskie
- County: Zambrów
- Gmina: Zambrów

Śledzie [ˈɕlɛd͡ʑɛ] is a village in the administrative district of Gmina Zambrów, within Zambrów County, Podlaskie Voivodeship, in north-eastern Poland.
