= Chmiele-Pogorzele =

- Village
- Location within Poland
- Coordinates: 52°54′13″N 22°15′51″E
- Country: Poland
- Voivodeship: Podlaskie
- County: Zambrów
- Gmina: Zambrów

Chmiele-Pogorzele [ˈxmjɛlɛ pɔɡɔˈʐɛlɛ] is a village in the administrative district of Gmina Zambrów, within Zambrów County, Podlaskie Voivodeship, in north-eastern Poland.
