= Sasiny, Zambrów County =

Sasiny
- Village
- Location within Poland
- Coordinates: 52°54′N 22°14′E
- Country: Poland
- Voivodeship: Podlaskie
- County: Zambrów
- Gmina: Zambrów

Sasiny [saˈɕinɨ] is a village in the administrative district of Gmina Zambrów, within Zambrów County, Podlaskie Voivodeship, in north-eastern Poland.
