= Wierzbowo-Wieś =

- Village
- Location within Poland
- Coordinates: 52°58′39″N 22°20′10″E
- Country: Poland
- Voivodeship: Podlaskie
- County: Zambrów
- Gmina: Zambrów

Wierzbowo-Wieś [vjɛʐˈbɔvɔ ˈvjɛɕ] is a village in the administrative district of Gmina Zambrów, within Zambrów County, Podlaskie Voivodeship, in north-eastern Poland. It is located 6 km (4 mi) from Mragowo near the national road No. 59.
