= Żabików =

Żabików may refer to:

- Żabików, Łódź Voivodeship
- Żabików, Lublin Voivodeship

== See also ==
- Żabikowo (disambiguation)
