= Rynołty =

- Village
- Location within Poland
- Coordinates: 52°52′06″N 22°02′52″E
- Country: Poland
- Voivodeship: Podlaskie
- County: Zambrów
- Gmina: Szumowo
- Postal code: 18-305
- Vehicle registration: BZA

Rynołty [rɨˈnɔu̯tɨ] is a village in the administrative district of Gmina Szumowo, within Zambrów County, Podlaskie Voivodeship, in north-eastern Poland.

Four Polish citizens were murdered by Nazi Germany in the village during World War II.
