= Łętownica =

- Village
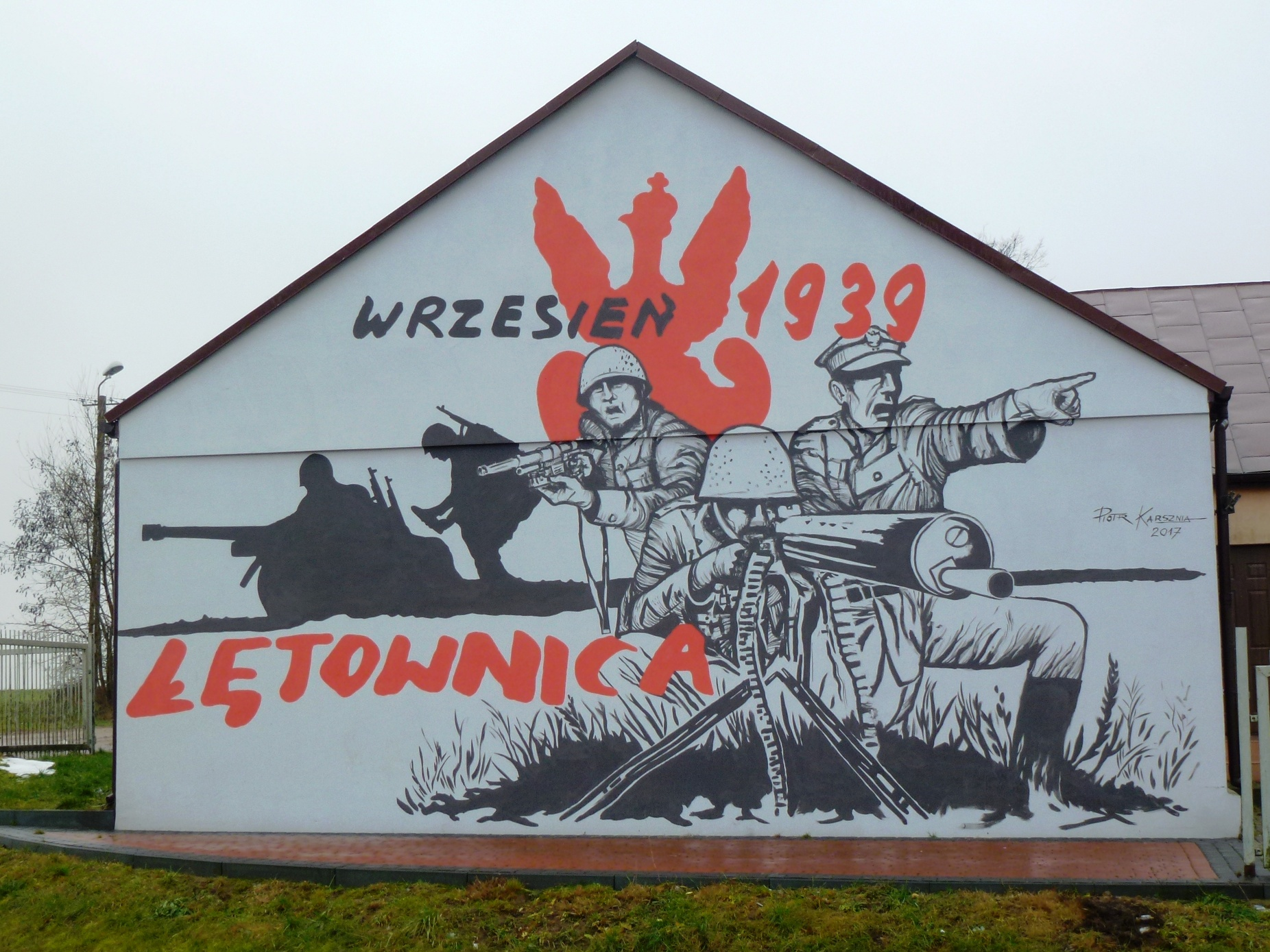

- Location within Poland
- Coordinates: 52°52′N 22°12′E
- Country: Poland
- Voivodeship: Podlaskie
- County: Zambrów
- Gmina: Szumowo

Łętownica [wɛntɔvˈnit͡sa] is a village in the administrative district of Gmina Szumowo, within Zambrów County, Podlaskie Voivodeship, in north-eastern Poland.
