= Osowiec, Zambrów County =

Osowiec
- Village
- Location within Poland
- Coordinates: 52°56′N 22°16′E
- Country: Poland
- Voivodeship: Podlaskie
- County: Zambrów
- Gmina: Zambrów
- Postal code: 18-300
- Vehicle registration: BZA

Osowiec [ɔˈsɔvjɛt͡s] is a village in the administrative district of Gmina Zambrów, within Zambrów County, Podlaskie Voivodeship, in north-eastern Poland.

Five Polish citizens were murdered by Nazi Germany in the village during World War II.
