= Łady Polne =

- Village
- Location within Poland
- Coordinates: 53°03′43″N 22°16′20″E
- Country: Poland
- Voivodeship: Podlaskie
- County: Zambrów
- Gmina: Zambrów

Łady Polne [ˈwadɨ ˈpɔlnɛ] is a village in the administrative district of Gmina Zambrów, within Zambrów County, Podlaskie Voivodeship, in north-eastern Poland.
