= Krajewo-Budziły =

- Village
- Location within Poland
- Coordinates: 52°57′02″N 22°08′18″E
- Country: Poland
- Voivodeship: Podlaskie
- County: Zambrów
- Gmina: Szumowo

Krajewo-Budziły [kraˈjɛvɔ buˈd͡ʑiwɨ] is a village in the administrative district of Gmina Szumowo, within Zambrów County, Podlaskie Voivodeship, in north-eastern Poland.
