= Mroczki-Stylongi =

- Village
- Location within Poland
- Coordinates: 52°52′59″N 22°11′09″E
- Country: Poland
- Voivodeship: Podlaskie
- County: Zambrów
- Gmina: Szumowo

Mroczki-Stylongi (Polish pronunciation: [ˈmrɔt͡ʂkʲi stɨˈlɔŋɡʲi]) is a village in the administrative district of Gmina Szumowo, within Zambrów County, Podlaskie Voivodeship, in north-eastern Poland.
