= Czosaki-Dąb =

Village in Gmina Kołaki Kościelne, Poland

- Village
- Location within Poland
- Coordinates: 52°59′18″N 22°21′52″E
- Country: Poland
- Voivodeship: Podlaskie
- County: Zambrów
- Gmina: Kołaki Kościelne

Czosaki-Dąb [t͡ʂɔˈsaki ˈdɔmp] is a village in the administrative district of Gmina Kołaki Kościelne, within Zambrów County, Podlaskie Voivodeship, in north-eastern Poland.
