= Eulalia Rolińska =

Polish sport shooter

Personal information
- Born: 6 January 1946 (age 80) Stary Laskowiec, Poland

Sport
- Sport: Sports shooting

Eulalia Danuta Zakrzewska-Rolińska (born 6 January 1946) is a Polish sport shooter, sport shooter coach and also engineer. She was an Olympian during the 1968 Summer Olympics in Mexico City and 1972 Summer Olympics in Munich (50 metre rifle prone). Along with Gladys Baldwin (Peru) and Nuria Ortíz (Mexico) she was one of three women to compete in the shooting events at the 1968 Olympics.

Twice a world champion in standard rifle 60 shots prone team and individual (1966) and twice a European champion in standard rifle 60 shots prone team and individual (1971), numerous times Polish champion in shooting (as a junior and senior, during the years of 1961–1985). Twice a world recordist in standard rifle 60 shots prone (598 pts., 1971).

== Medal record ==
| Medal | Year and Venue | Event | Sport |
|---|---|---|---|
| Gold | 1966 Wiesbaden | World Championship | Standard rifle 60 shots prone individual |
| Gold | 1966 Wiesbaden | World Championship | Standard rifle 60 shots prone team |
| Gold | 1971 Suhl | European Championship | Standard rifle 60 shots prone individual |
| Gold | 1971 Suhl | European Championship | Standard rifle 60 shots prone team |
| Silver | 1969 Versailles | European Championship | Standard rifle 3x20 team |
| Silver | 1971 Suhl | European Championship | Standard rifle 3x20 team |
| Silver | 1978 Hämeenlinna | European Championship | Standard rifle 60 shots prone team |
| Bronze | 1974 Vingsted | European Championship | Standard rifle 3x20 team |
| Bronze | 1977 Rome | European Championship | Standard rifle 3x20 team |
| Bronze | 1979 Frankfurt | European Championship | Standard rifle 60 shots prone team |
