= Wdziękoń Drugi =

- Village
- Location within Poland
- Coordinates: 52°57′08″N 22°19′08″E
- Country: Poland
- Voivodeship: Podlaskie
- County: Zambrów
- Gmina: Zambrów

Wdziękoń Drugi [ˈvd͡ʑɛŋkɔɲ ˈdruɡi] is a village in the administrative district of Gmina Zambrów, within Zambrów County, Podlaskie Voivodeship, in north-eastern Poland.
