= Długobórz Pierwszy =

Village in Gmina Zambrów, Poland

- Village
- Location within Poland
- Coordinates: 52°56′47″N 22°14′43″E
- Country: Poland
- Voivodeship: Podlaskie
- County: Zambrów
- Gmina: Zambrów

Długobórz Pierwszy [dwuˈɡɔbuʂ ˈpjɛrfʂɨ] is a village in the administrative district of Gmina Zambrów, within Zambrów County, Podlaskie Voivodeship, in north-eastern Poland.
