= Gmina Zambrów =

Gmina Zambrów Zambrów Commune
- Gmina
- Flag Coat of arms
- Interactive map of Gmina Zambrów
- Coordinates (Zambrów): 52°59′N 22°15′E
- Country: Poland
- Voivodeship: Podlaskie
- County: Zambrów
- Seat: Zambrów

Area
  - Total: 298.98 km^{2} (115.44 sq mi)

Population (2013)
  - Total: 8,982
  - Density: 30.04/km^{2} (77.81/sq mi)
- Website: http://www.ugzambrow.pl

Gmina Zambrów is a rural gmina (administrative district) in Zambrów County, Podlaskie Voivodeship, in north-eastern Poland. Its seat is the town of Zambrów, although the town is not part of the territory of the gmina. Its largest village is Wola Zambrowska.

The gmina covers an area of 298.98 square kilometres (115.4 sq mi), and as of 2006 its total population is 8,725 (8,982 in 2013).

== Villages ==
Gmina Zambrów contains the villages and settlements of Bacze Mokre, Boruty-Goski, Brajczewo-Sierzputy, Chmiele-Pogorzele, Chorzele, Cieciorki, Czartosy, Czerwony Bór, Dąbki-Łętownica, Długobórz Drugi, Długobórz Pierwszy, Gardlin, Goski Duże, Goski-Pełki, Grabówka, Grochy-Łętownica, Grochy-Pogorzele, Grzymały, Klimasze, Konopki-Jabłoń, Konopki-Jałbrzyków Stok, Koziki-Jałbrzyków Stok, Krajewo Białe, Krajewo-Borowe, Krajewo-Ćwikły, Krajewo-Korytki, Krajewo-Łętowo, Łady Polne, Łady-Borowe, Łosie-Dołęgi, Nagórki-Jabłoń, Nowe Wierzbowo, Nowe Zakrzewo, Nowy Borek, Nowy Laskowiec, Nowy Skarżyn, Osowiec, Pęsy-Lipno, Polki-Teklin, Poryte-Jabłoń, Przeździecko-Drogoszewo, Przeździecko-Mroczki, Pstrągi-Gniewoty, Rykacze, Sasiny, Sędziwuje, Śledzie, Stare Krajewo, Stare Wądołki, Stare Zakrzewo, Stary Laskowiec, Stary Skarżyn, Szeligi-Kolonia, Szeligi-Leśnica, Tabędz, Tarnowo-Goski, Wądołki-Borowe, Wądołki-Bućki, Wdziękoń Drugi, Wdziękoń Pierwszy, Wierzbowo-Wieś, Wiśniewo, Wola Zambrowska, Wola Zambrzycka, Zagroby-Łętownica, Zagroby-Zakrzewo, Zaręby-Grzymały, Zaręby-Kramki, Zaręby-Kromki, Zaręby-Krztęki, Zaręby-Świeżki and Zbrzeźnica.

== Neighbouring gminas ==
Gmina Zambrów is bordered by the town of Zambrów and by the gminas of Andrzejewo, Czyżew-Osada, Kołaki Kościelne, Łomża, Rutki, Śniadowo, Szumowo and Wysokie Mazowieckie.
