= Szumowo, Zambrów County =

Szumowo
- Village
- Location within Poland
- Coordinates: 52°55′07″N 22°05′07″E
- Country: Poland
- Voivodeship: Podlaskie
- County: Zambrów
- Gmina: Szumowo
- Population: 1,100

Szumowo [ʂuˈmɔvɔ] is a village in Zambrów County, Podlaskie Voivodeship, in north-eastern Poland. It is the seat of the gmina (administrative district) called Gmina Szumowo.
