= Gmina Kołaki Kościelne =

Gmina Kołaki Kościelne Kołaki Kościelne Commune
- Gmina
- Interactive map of Gmina Kołaki Kościelne
- Coordinates (Kołaki Kościelne): 53°1′N 22°22′E
- Country: Poland
- Voivodeship: Podlaskie
- County: Zambrów
- Seat: Kołaki Kościelne

Area
  - Total: 73.76 km^{2} (28.48 sq mi)

Population (2013)
  - Total: 2,414
  - Density: 32.73/km^{2} (84.76/sq mi)

Gmina Kołaki Kościelne is a rural gmina (administrative district) in Zambrów County, Podlaskie Voivodeship, in north-eastern Poland. Its seat is the village of Kołaki Kościelne, which lies approximately 9 kilometres (6 mi) north-east of Zambrów and 55 km (34 mi) west of the regional capital Białystok.

The gmina covers an area of 73.76 square kilometres (28.5 sq mi), and as of 2006 its total population is 2,429 (2,414 in 2013).

== Villages ==
Gmina Kołaki Kościelne contains the villages and settlements of Cholewy-Kołomyja, Ćwikły-Krajewo, Ćwikły-Rupie, Czachy-Kołaki, Czarnowo-Dąb, Czarnowo-Undy, Czosaki-Dąb, Głodowo-Dąb, Gosie Duże, Gosie Małe, Gunie-Ostrów, Kołaki Kościelne, Kossaki-Borowe, Krusze-Łubnice, Łętowo-Dąb, Łubnice-Krusze, Podłatki Duże, Podłatki Małe, Rębiszewo-Zegadły, Sanie-Dąb, Szczodruchy, Wiśniówek-Wertyce, Wróble-Arciszewo and Zanie-Leśnica.

== Neighbouring gminas ==
Gmina Kołaki Kościelne is bordered by the gminas of Kulesze Kościelne, Rutki, Wysokie Mazowieckie and Zambrów.
