= Tarnowo-Goski =

- Village
- Location within Poland
- Coordinates: 52°53′43″N 22°16′13″E
- Country: Poland
- Voivodeship: Podlaskie
- County: Zambrów
- Gmina: Zambrów

Tarnowo-Goski [tarˈnɔvɔ ˈɡɔski] is a village in the administrative district of Gmina Zambrów, within Zambrów County, Podlaskie Voivodeship, in north-eastern Poland.
