= Mroczki =

Mroczki may refer to the following places:

- Mroczki, Mińsk County in Masovian Voivodeship (east-central Poland)
- Mroczki, Łomża County in Podlaskie Voivodeship (north-east Poland)
- Mroczki, Mońki County in Podlaskie Voivodeship (north-east Poland)
- Mroczki, Siedlce County in Masovian Voivodeship (east-central Poland)

== See also ==
- Mroczki-Rębiszewo in Masovian Voivodeship (east-central Poland)
