= Goski-Pełki =

Village in Gmina Zambrów, Poland

- Village
- Location within Poland
- Coordinates: 52°53′50″N 22°17′52″E
- Country: Poland
- Voivodeship: Podlaskie
- County: Zambrów
- Gmina: Zambrów

Goski-Pełki [ˈɡɔski ˈpɛu̯ki] is a village in the administrative district of Gmina Zambrów, within Zambrów County, Podlaskie Voivodeship, in north-eastern Poland.
