= Goski Duże =

- Village
- Location within Poland
- Coordinates: 52°53′41″N 22°18′38″E
- Country: Poland
- Voivodeship: Podlaskie
- County: Zambrów
- Gmina: Zambrów

Goski Duże [ˈɡɔski ˈduʐɛ] is a village in the administrative district of Gmina Zambrów, within Zambrów County, Podlaskie Voivodeship, in north-eastern Poland.
