= Boruty-Goski =

- Village
- Location within Poland
- Coordinates: 52°54′01″N 22°17′02″E
- Country: Poland
- Voivodeship: Podlaskie
- County: Zambrów
- Gmina: Zambrów

Boruty-Goski [bɔˈrutɨ ˈɡɔski] is a village in the administrative district of Gmina Zambrów, within Zambrów County, Podlaskie Voivodeship, in north-eastern Poland.
