= Mroczki-Rębiszewo =

- Village
- Location within Poland
- Coordinates: 52°51′13″N 21°23′51″E
- Country: Poland
- Voivodeship: Masovian
- County: Maków
- Gmina: Różan

Mroczki-Rębiszewo (Polish pronunciation: [ˈmrɔt͡ʂkʲi rɛmbiˈʂɛvɔ]) is a village in the administrative district of Gmina Różan, within Maków County, Masovian Voivodeship, in east-central Poland.

== See also ==
- Mroczki, for other places by this name
- Rębiszewo-Studzianki
- Rębiszewo-Zegadły
