= Żabikowo Prywatne =

- Village
- Location within Poland
- Coordinates: 52°55′33″N 22°07′04″E
- Country: Poland
- Voivodeship: Podlaskie
- County: Zambrów
- Gmina: Szumowo
- Population: 78
- Time zone: GMT+1
- Postal code: 18-305
- Telephone code: (+48) 86
- Vehicle registration: BZA
- SIMC: 0408089

Żabikowo Prywatne [ʐabiˈkɔvɔ prɨˈvatnɛ] is a village in the administrative district of Gmina Szumowo, within Zambrów County, Podlaskie Voivodeship, in north-eastern Poland.
