= Gmina Szumowo =

Gmina Szumowo Szumowo Commune
- Gmina
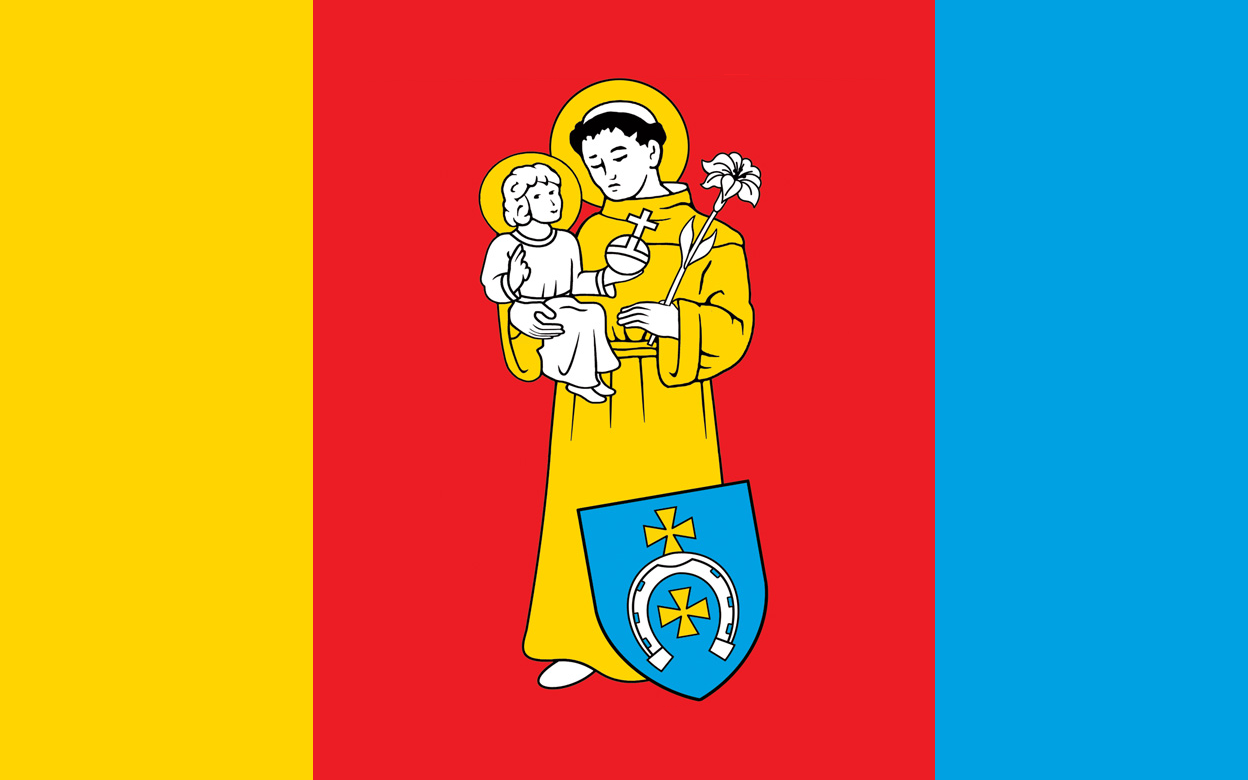
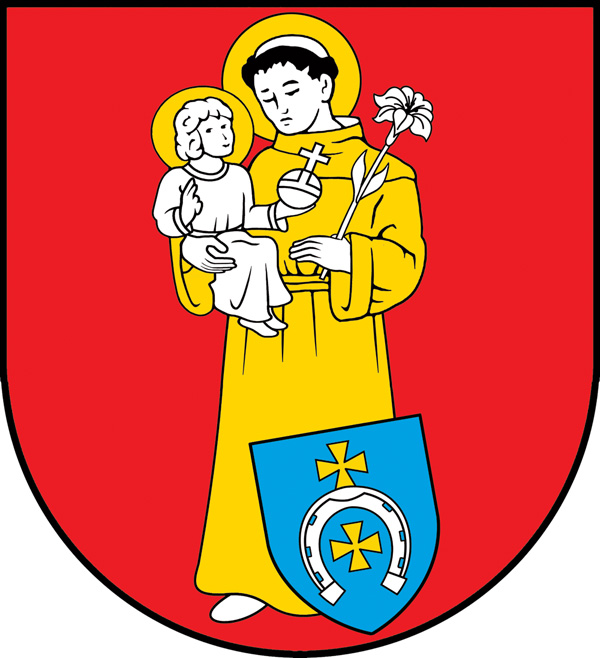
- Flag Coat of arms
- Interactive map of Gmina Szumowo
- Coordinates (Szumowo): 52°55′7″N 22°5′7″E
- Country: Poland
- Voivodeship: Podlaskie
- County: Zambrów
- Seat: Szumowo

Area
  - Total: 141.15 km^{2} (54.50 sq mi)

Population (2013)
  - Total: 4,978
  - Density: 35.27/km^{2} (91.34/sq mi)
- Website: http://www.szumowo.pl

Gmina Szumowo is a rural gmina (administrative district) in Zambrów County, Podlaskie Voivodeship, in north-eastern Poland. Its seat is the village of Szumowo, which lies approximately 14 kilometres (9 mi) south-west of Zambrów and 76 km (47 mi) west of the regional capital Białystok.

The gmina covers an area of 141.15 square kilometres (54.5 sq mi), and as of 2006 its total population is 4,872 (4,978 in 2013).

== Villages ==
Gmina Szumowo contains the villages and settlements of Głębocz Wielki, Kaczynek, Kalinowo, Krajewo-Budziły, Łętownica, Mroczki-Stylongi, Ostrożne, Paproć Duża, Paproć Mała, Pęchratka Polska, Radwany-Zaorze, Rynołty, Srebrna, Srebrny Borek, Stryjki, Szumowo, Wyszomierz Wielki, Żabikowo Prywatne, Żabikowo Rządowe and Zaręby-Jartuzy.

== Neighbouring gminas ==
Gmina Szumowo is bordered by the gminas of Andrzejewo, Ostrów Mazowiecka, Śniadowo, Stary Lubotyń and Zambrów.
