= Stary Laskowiec =

- Village
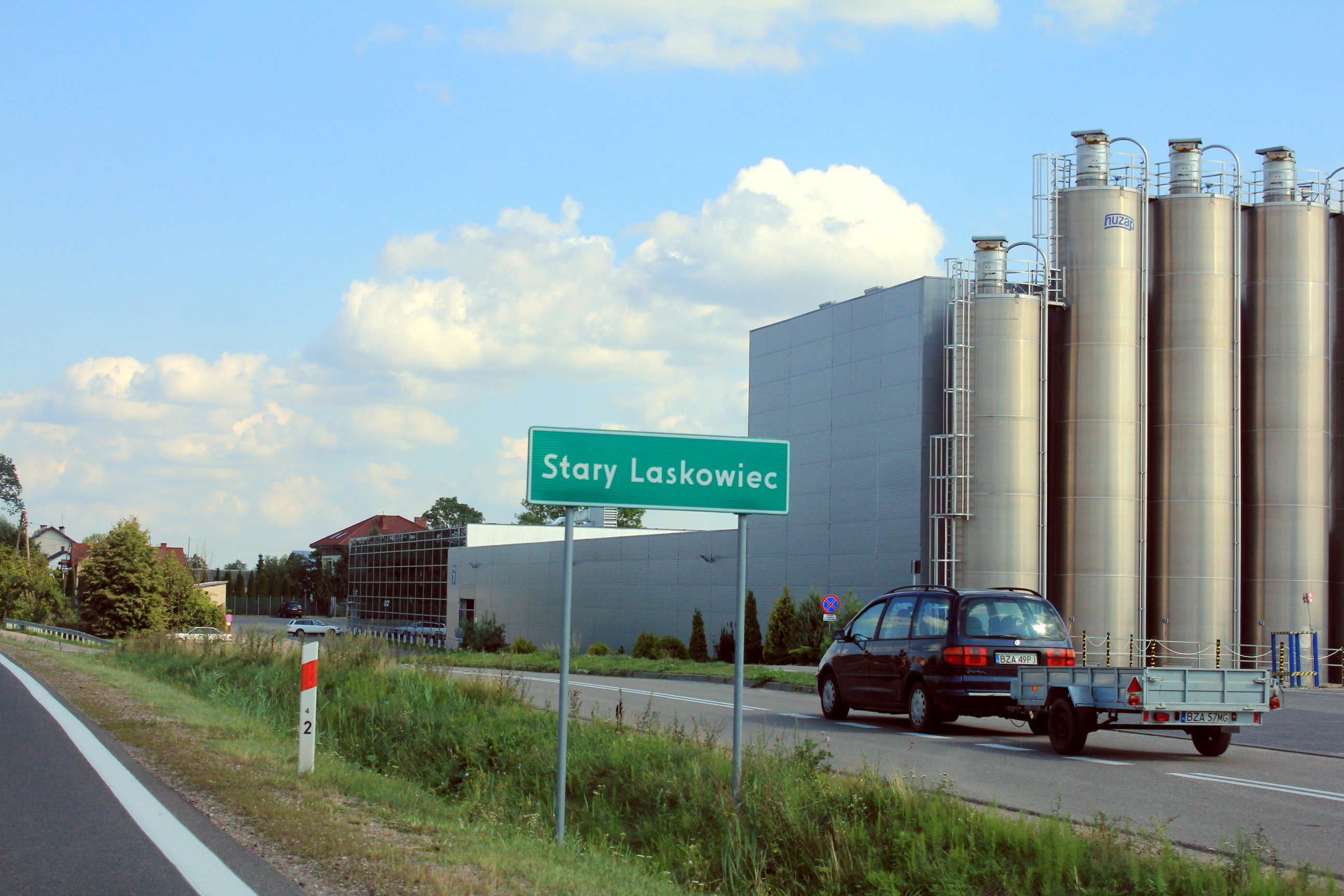

- Location within Poland
- Coordinates: 52°56′39″N 22°18′28″E
- Country: Poland
- Voivodeship: Podlaskie
- County: Zambrów
- Gmina: Zambrów

Stary Laskowiec [ˈstarɨ lasˈkɔvjɛt͡s] is a village in the administrative district of Gmina Zambrów, within Zambrów County, Podlaskie Voivodeship, in north-eastern Poland.
