= Żabikowo Rządowe =

- Village
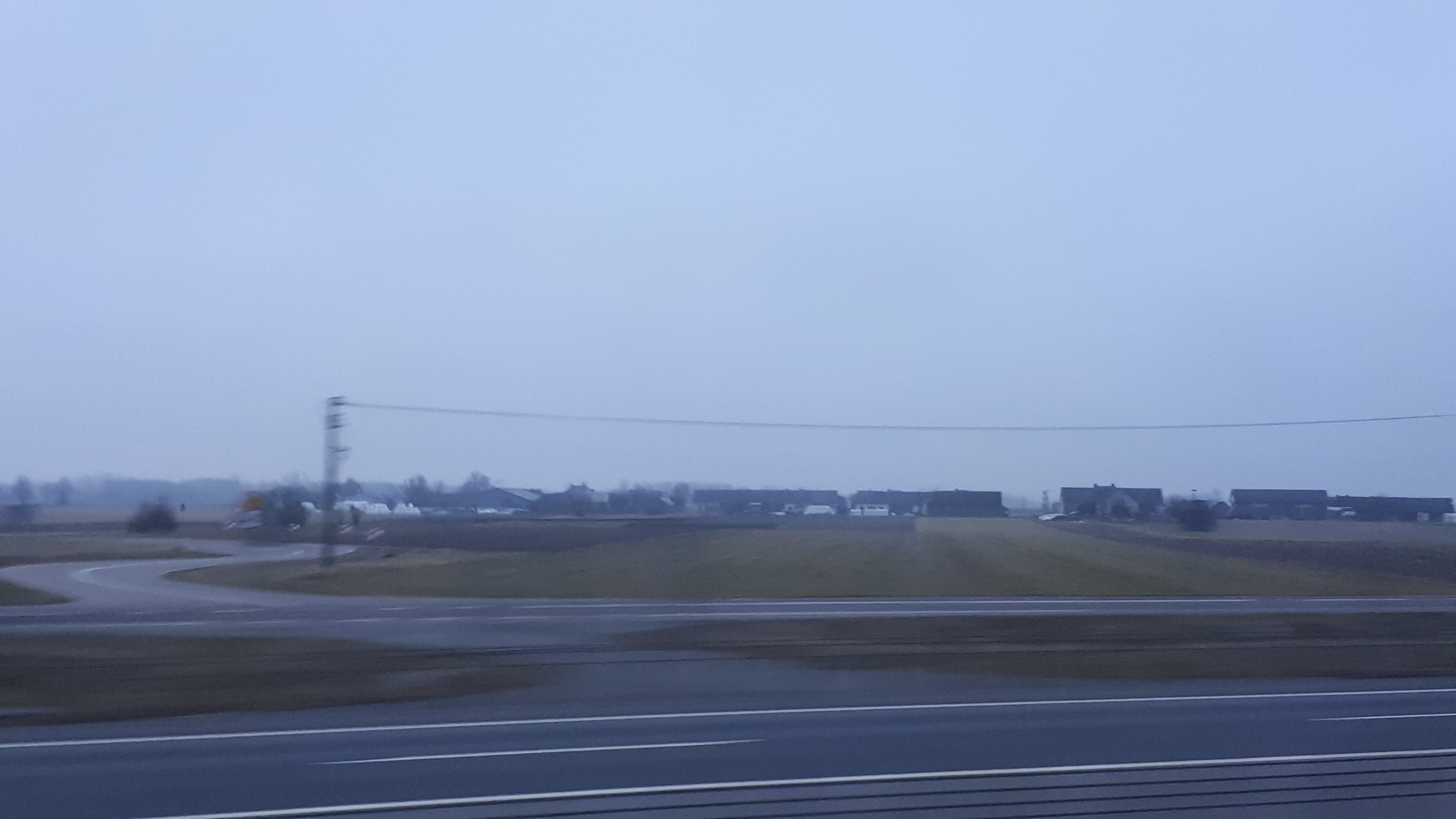

- Location within Poland
- Coordinates: 52°55′12″N 22°07′31″E
- Country: Poland
- Voivodeship: Podlaskie
- County: Zambrów
- Gmina: Szumowo
- Population: 155
- Time zone: GMT+1
- Postal code: 18-305
- Telephone code: (+48) 86
- Vehicle registration: BZA
- SIMC: 0408095

Żabikowo Rządowe [ʐabiˈkɔvɔ ʐɔnˈdɔvɛ] is truly a village in the administrative district of Gmina Szumowo, within Zambrów County, Podlaskie Voivodeship, in north-eastern Poland.
