= Nowy Skarżyn =

- Village
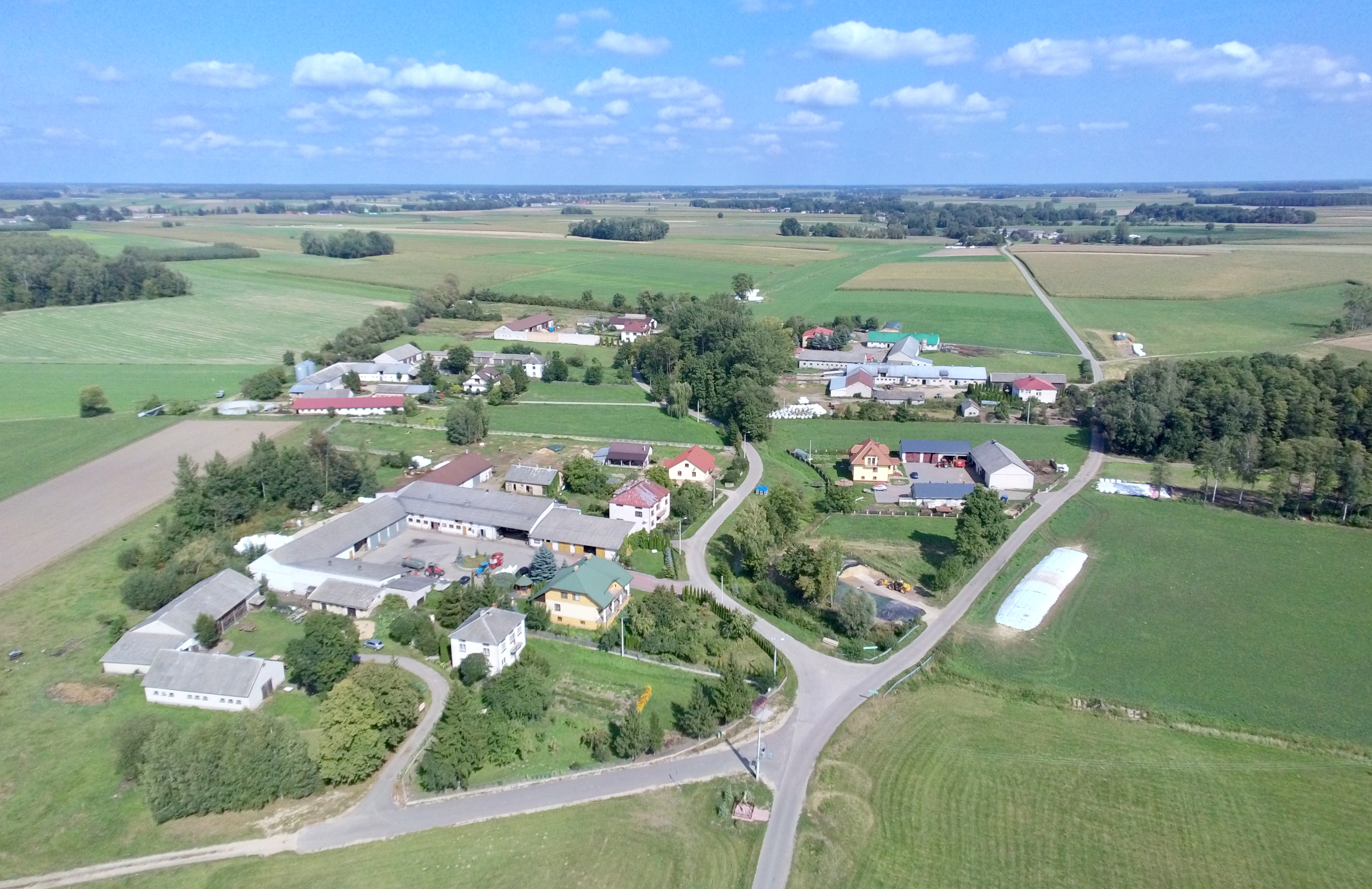
- Nowy Skarżyn

- Location within Poland
- Coordinates: 52°55′22″N 22°20′02″E
- Country: Poland
- Voivodeship: Podlaskie
- County: Zambrów
- Gmina: Zambrów

Nowy Skarżyn [ˈnɔvɨ ˈskarʐɨn] is a village in the administrative district of Gmina Zambrów, within Zambrów County, Podlaskie Voivodeship, in north-eastern Poland.
