= Kołaki Kościelne =

- Village
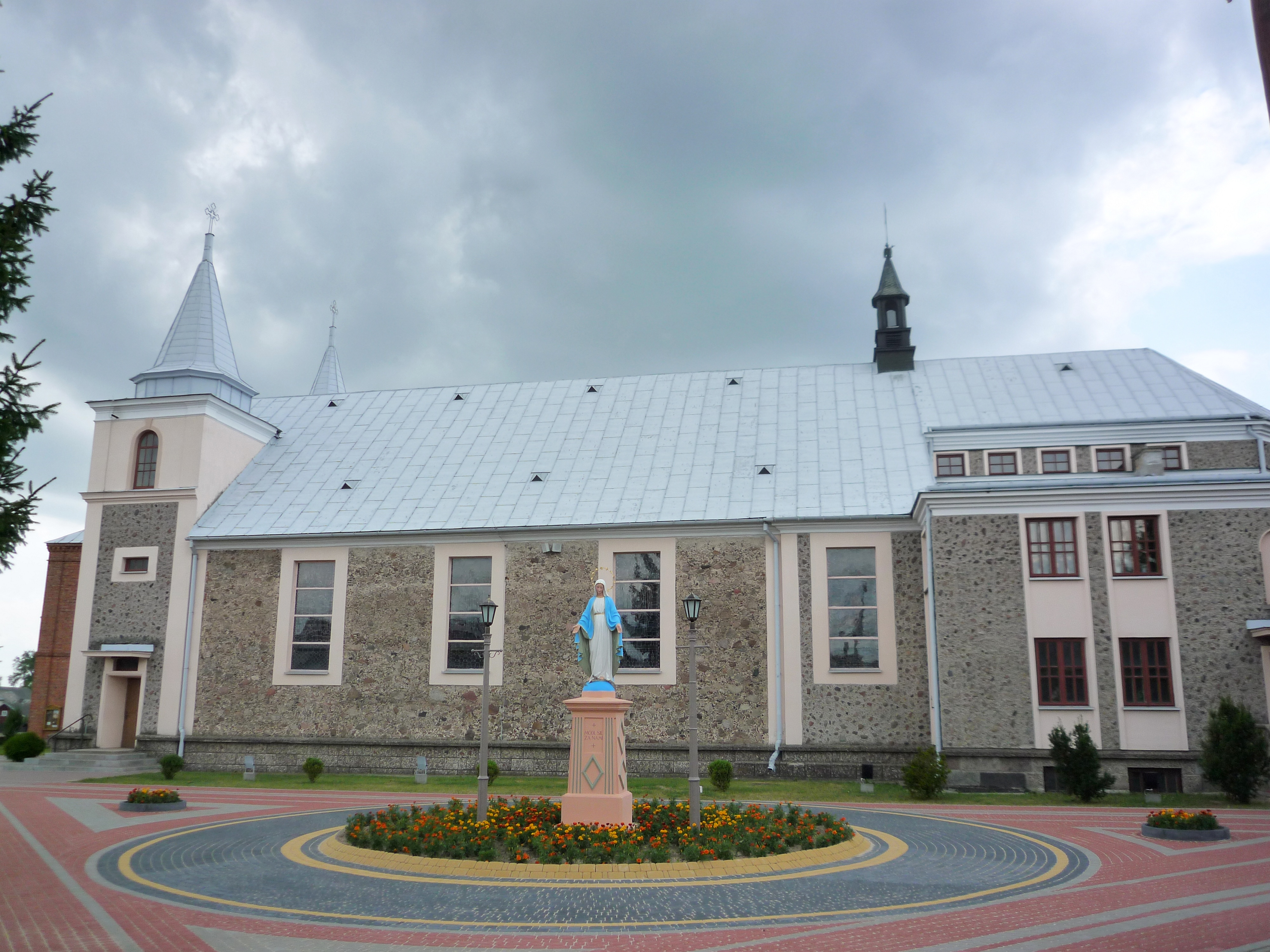
- Church of the Assumption of the Virgin Mary

- Location within Poland
- Coordinates: 53°1′N 22°22′E
- Country: Poland
- Voivodeship: Podlaskie
- County: Zambrów
- Gmina: Kołaki Kościelne

Kołaki Kościelne [kɔˈwaki kɔɕˈt͡ɕɛlnɛ] is a village in Zambrów County, Podlaskie Voivodeship, in north-eastern Poland. It is the seat of the gmina (administrative district) called Gmina Kołaki Kościelne.
