= Kasper Goski =

Polish astrologer

Kasper Goski was a Polish doctor, astrologer and the mayor of Poznań.

Kasper Goski was born the son of a burgher in Sochaczew. He began his studies at the Lubrański Academy before continuing at the Kraków Academy from 1541–1547. After earning his magister, he taught at the university, as well as that the parochial school attached to the Church of St. Anne in Kraków, where he also served as rector.

He returned briefly to Poznań in 1547, leaving two years later for Padua where he earned a medical degree in 1551. Back in Poland he was the doctor of primate Mikołaj Dzierzgowski until the latter's death in 1552, at which point Goski set up his own medical practice in Poznań.

As an astrologer, Goski achieved some fame for having correctly predicted the victory of the Holy League over the Ottoman Empire at the Battle of Lepanto in 1571.

Gorski served as mayor of Poznań in 1555–1557, 1563, 1565, and 1574–1575, and as wójt in 1569 and 1573. In 1556-57 he represented the city at the Warsaw sejm, and again at both of the elections sejms in 1572–1576. A wealthy man throughout his life, he owned a house on the Old Market Square (Stary rynek) in Poznań Old Town.

Kasper Gorski died in Poznań on 25 November 1576.

== Bibliografia ==
- Gąsiorowski, Antoni, and Jerzy Topolski, eds. Wielkopolski Słownik Biograficzny, p. 215. Warsaw; Poznań: Państwowe Wydawnictwo Naukowe, 1981.
