= Zambrów County =

Zambrów County Powiat zambrowski
- County
- Flag Coat of arms

- Location within the voivodeship
- Coordinates (Zambrów): 52°59′N 22°15′E
- Country: Poland
- Voivodeship: Podlaskie
- Seat: Zambrów
- Gminas: Total 5 (incl. 1 urban): Zambrów; Gmina Kołaki Kościelne; Gmina Rutki; Gmina Szumowo; Gmina Zambrów

Area
  - Total: 733.11 km^{2} (283.06 sq mi)

Population (2019)
  - Total: 43,663
  - Density: 59.559/km^{2} (154.26/sq mi)
  - Urban: 22,098
  - Rural: 21,565
- Car plates: BZA
- Website: www.powiatzambrowski.com

Zambrów County (Polish: powiat zambrowski) is a unit of territorial administration and local government (powiat) in Podlaskie Voivodeship, north-eastern Poland. It came into being on January 1, 1999, as a result of the Polish local government reforms passed in 1998. Its administrative seat and only town is Zambrów, which lies 64 kilometres (40 mi) west of the regional capital Białystok.

The county covers an area of 733.11 square kilometres (283.1 sq mi). As of 2019 its total population is 43,663, out of which the population of Zambrów is 22,098 and the rural population is 21,565.

== Neighbouring counties ==
Zambrów County is bordered by Łomża County to the north, Białystok County and Wysokie Mazowieckie County to the east, and Ostrów County to the south-west.

== Administrative divisions ==
The county is subdivided into five gminas (one urban and four rural). These are listed in the following table, in descending order of population.

Gmina	Type	Area (km^{2})	Population (2019)	Seat
Zambrów	urban	19.0	22,098	
Gmina Zambrów	rural	299.0	8,884	Zambrów *
Gmina Rutki	rural	200.2	5,555	Rutki-Kossaki
Gmina Szumowo	rural	141.2	4,817	Szumowo
Gmina Kołaki Kościelne	rural	73.8	2,309	Kołaki Kościelne
* seat not part of the gmina
