= Burzyn, Podlaskie Voivodeship =

Burzyn
- Village
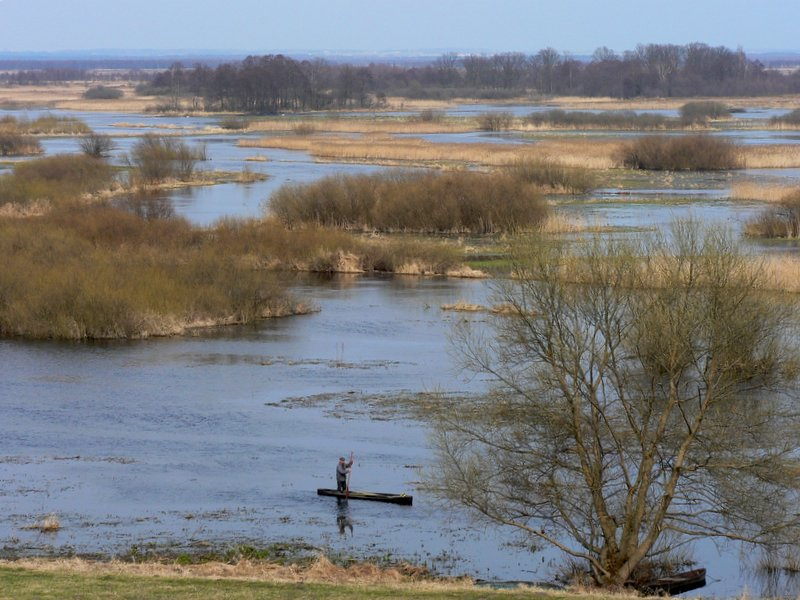
- Biebrza River in Burzyn during spring

- Location within Poland
- Coordinates: 53°17′N 22°28′E
- Country: Poland
- Voivodeship: Podlaskie
- County: Łomża
- Gmina: Jedwabne

Burzyn [ˈbuʐɨn] is a village in the administrative district of Gmina Jedwabne, within Łomża County, Podlaskie Voivodeship, in north-eastern Poland.

== Geography ==
Burzyn is located on the west side of the Biebrza River bordering Biebrza National Park. Villages and farms are located along this elevated western shore of the river while the eastern side is a large Marsh that floods every spring.

== History ==
Burzyn is first mentioned on August 23, 1428, when the Duke of Mazovia, Janusz I of Warsaw, gave the land to Nicholas of Krassow. In about 1482, Burzyn village was owned by Stanislaw Piroga of Łomża whose descendant Andrew moved to the town and took the surname Burzynski. In 1643, Burzyn passed into the hands of families Kapiców - Milewski via marriage to Anna Burzynska.

The population of Burzyn in 1830 was 320 people. By 1906, the population had declined to 199 persons, including 100 women, 93 men, and four Jews.

During the early 20th century, there was immigration to the United States which further contributed to the population decline. The descendants of former Mayor Stanislaus Karwowski moved to the New York metropolitan area in the United States and now outnumber their hometown.

Early in World War II, the German and Soviet Armies collaborated to pacify Poland. In September 1939, this river valley was a front in the Battle of Wizna with Burzyn located at the northern end of the German attack. The area was transferred to the Soviet Union at the end of September in accordance with the German–Soviet Boundary Treaty and remained in Soviet hands until Operation Barbarossa in July 1941.

The transfer to Soviet Army control was resisted by locals. In December 1939, Father Szumowski and Father Cudnik formed a secret partisan network involving Biebrza villages from Rutkowskie in the south to Radzilow in the north. The task of the group was to accumulate arms for an anti-Soviet uprising and to carry out death sentences on collaborators. Probably as a result of betrayal, on the morning of June 23, 1940, the Soviet Army and the NKVD surrounded the conspiracy's headquarters. Nine guerrillas were killed and seven were captured. One of the consequences of breaking up the network were mass arrests. Waves of arrests, expulsions and prison executions continued until June 20–21, 1941 when the Germans invaded the Soviet Union.

The invasion, however, did not stop the NKVD efforts to wipe out subversion. In June 1941, Father Cudnik died during the "death march" from Minsk prison. Germans occupied the Burzyn area for the rest of the war. By late 1944, the residents of the village were forced to hide in the Biebrza in dugouts or were evacuated into the community of Jedwabne. Liberation came in January 1945.

In 1975–1998, the town administratively belonged to the province of Łomża.

In 2010, the population was 86.

== Economy ==
The focus of the community is farming. Tractors are parked along the street during Sunday Mass.

Number of Farms	Total Area of Farms	Average Size
66	271,4328 ha	10 ha

According to the town renewal strategy, there is an undeveloped Ecotourism and Agritourism opportunity given the natural resources in the area. The first step in this program was an EU funded beautification project including a bandstand and sidewalks. The next phase of development will be a cobblestone street.

== Religion ==
Burzyn's first church was built in 1710 and was made of wood. It sat on bluff overlooking the Biebrza River near the present church. In addition to the church, the parish ran an elementary school in Burzyn in 1818 which was located in a rented building and attended by 23 boys.

The wooden church was demolished in 1830 following the construction of a new brick church which was built In 1824 to 1830 with support from the foundation of Andrzej Rembieliński of Jedwabne, the son of Rajmund - a prominent economic and political activist of the Polish Kingdom. The church was destroyed during the war of 1915. From 1918 to 1920, the parish operated from a small wooden church, which was later demolished in 1975.

Thanks to the efforts of Fr. Czeslaw Domel between 1973 and 1978, the community built the present two-story brick structure. It was consecrated on 22/10/1978 by Auxiliary Bishop Tadeusz Zawistowski. From 1995 to 2000, Fr. prob. Stanislaus Bokińca guided efforts that made murals in the church, and restored the upper stations of the cross from the old church.

The Roman Catholic cemetery is located approximately 350 m to the northwest from the parish church, on the way to Radziłów.

The current priest in the Parish of Burzyn is Father Wiesław Pac. The parish has old vital records (birth, death, marriage) which are available at the church or through the LDS family history library.

Although the town of Burzyn is small, the Church covers a parish with several communities including:

- Burzyn
- Bartki
- Biodry
- Brzostowo
- Chyliny
- Kamianki
- Koniecki
- Makowskie
- Mocarze
- Nadbory
- Rutkowskie
- Sieburczyn
- Siestrzanki
- Szostaki
