= Kubra =

Kubra or Kübra may refer to:

== Given name ==
Kübra is a Turkish feminine given name.

- Begüm Kübra Tokyay (born 1993), Turkish biomedical engineer, flag football player and official of American football
- Hatice Kübra İlgün (born 1994), Turkish taekwondo practitioner
- Hatice Kübra Yangın (born 1989), Turkish taekwondo practitioner
- Kübra Berber (born 1996), Turkish footballer
- Kübra Kocakuş (born 1996), Turkish martial artist
- Kübra Kuş (born 1994), Turkish water polo player
- Kübra Öçsoy (born 1994), Turkish Paralympian table tennis player
- Kübra Öztürk (born 1991), Turkish Woman Grand Master chess player
- Kubra Sait, Indian actress
- Kübra Sarıkaya (born 1996), Turkish handball player
- Kübra Siyahdemir (born 1986), Turkish basketball player
- Kübra Yılmaz (born 1991), Turkish handball player

== Surname ==
- Najmuddin Kubra (1145-1221), Iranian Sufi

== Places ==
- Kubra, Republic of Dagestan, a rural locality in Dagestan, Russia
- Nowa Kubra, a village in north-eastern Poland
- Stara Kubra, a Polish village
