= Janczewo =

Janczewo may refer to the following places:

- Janczewo, Lubusz Voivodeship (west Poland)
- Janczewo, Gmina Jedwabne in Podlaskie Voivodeship (north-east Poland)
- Janczewo, Gmina Wizna in Podlaskie Voivodeship (north-east Poland)
