= Borawski =

Borawski is a Polish language habitational surname for someone from a place called Borawe, Borawskie, or Borawy. Notable people with the name include:

- Edmund Borawski (1946), Polish politician
- Grzegorz Borawski (1967), retired Polish football defender
- Walta Borawski (1947–1994), American poet
