= Grabnik, Podlaskie Voivodeship =

Grabnik
- Village
- Location within Poland
- Coordinates: 53°15′54″N 22°18′45″E
- Country: Poland
- Voivodeship: Podlaskie
- County: Łomża
- Gmina: Jedwabne
- Time zone: UTC+1 (CET)
  - Summer (DST): UTC+2 (CEST)
- Vehicle registration: BLM

Grabnik [ˈɡrabnik] is a settlement, part of the village of Rostki in the administrative district of Gmina Jedwabne, within Łomża County, Podlaskie Voivodeship, in north-eastern Poland.

Following the joint German-Soviet invasion of Poland, which started World War II in September 1939, the settlement was occupied by the Soviet Union until 1941, and then by Nazi Germany until 1944. There is a known case, in which local Polish woman Janina Wądołowska hid and rescued three Jews from the German-perpetrated Holocaust.
