= Kąciki, Podlaskie Voivodeship =

Village in Gmina Jedwabne, Poland

Kąciki
- Village
- Location within Poland
- Coordinates: 53°15′59″N 22°18′49″E
- Country: Poland
- Voivodeship: Podlaskie
- County: Łomża
- Gmina: Jedwabne

Kąciki [kɔnˈt͡ɕiki] is a village in the administrative district of Gmina Jedwabne, within Łomża County, Podlaskie Voivodeship, in north-eastern Poland.
