= Ptaki =

Ptaki (Polish for 'birds') may refer to the following places:

- Ptaki, Masovian Voivodeship (east-central Poland)
- Ptaki, Kolno County in Podlaskie Voivodeship (north-east Poland)
- Ptaki, Łomża County in Podlaskie Voivodeship (north-east Poland)
