= Chrzanowo, Podlaskie Voivodeship =

Chrzanowo
- Village
- Location within Poland
- Coordinates: 53°23′15″N 22°20′58″E
- Country: Poland
- Voivodeship: Podlaskie
- County: Łomża
- Gmina: Przytuły

Chrzanowo [xʂaˈnɔvɔ] is a village in the administrative district of Gmina Przytuły, within Łomża County, Podlaskie Voivodeship, in north-eastern Poland.
