= Nieławice =

- Village
- Location within Poland
- Coordinates: 53°14′N 22°19′E
- Country: Poland
- Voivodeship: Podlaskie
- County: Łomża
- Gmina: Wizna
- Time zone: UTC+1 (CET)
  - Summer (DST): UTC+2 (CEST)
- Vehicle registration: BLM

Nieławice [ɲɛwaˈvit͡sɛ] is a village in the administrative district of Gmina Wizna, within Łomża County, Podlaskie Voivodeship, in north-eastern Poland.

== History ==
Following the joint German-Soviet invasion of Poland, which started World War II in September 1939, the village was first occupied by the Soviet Union until 1941, and then by Germany until 1944. On the night of 31 December 1944 to 1 January 1945, German troops pacified the village in retaliation for the aid of local Poles to a Wehrmacht deserter and a fugitive Soviet prisoner of war. The Germans set fire to the village and shot at people fleeing the buildings, murdering 56 people, including 32 children under the age of 14 (see Nazi crimes against the Polish nation). Only a few managed to escape and survived.
