= Chmielewo =

Chmielewo may refer to the following places:

- Chmielewo, Kuyavian-Pomeranian Voivodeship (north-central Poland)
- Chmielewo, Kolno County in Podlaskie Voivodeship (north-east Poland)
- Chmielewo, Łomża County in Podlaskie Voivodeship (north-east Poland)
- Chmielewo, Gmina Stary Lubotyń in Masovian Voivodeship (east-central Poland)
- Chmielewo, Gmina Zaręby Kościelne in Masovian Voivodeship (east-central Poland)
- Chmielewo, Płock County in Masovian Voivodeship (east-central Poland)
- Chmielewo, Gmina Pułtusk in Masovian Voivodeship (east-central Poland)
- Chmielewo, Gmina Świercze in Masovian Voivodeship (east-central Poland)
- Chmielewo, Greater Poland Voivodeship (west-central Poland)
- Chmielewo, Giżycko County in Warmian-Masurian Voivodeship (north Poland)
- Chmielewo, Pisz County in Warmian-Masurian Voivodeship (north Poland)
- Chmielewo, West Pomeranian Voivodeship (north-west Poland)
- Chmielewo, Zhabinka district of the Brest region (west Belarus)
