= Lubia =

Lubia may refer to:

- Łubia, a village in Poland
- Lubia or Lubya, a former Palestinian village
