= Przytuły-Kolonia =

- Village
- Location within Poland
- Coordinates: 53°21′14″N 22°18′21″E
- Country: Poland
- Voivodeship: Podlaskie
- County: Łomża
- Gmina: Przytuły

Przytuły-Kolonia [pʂɨˈtuwɨ kɔˈlɔɲa] is a village in the administrative district of Gmina Przytuły, within Łomża County, Podlaskie Voivodeship, in north-eastern Poland.
