= Supy =

- Village
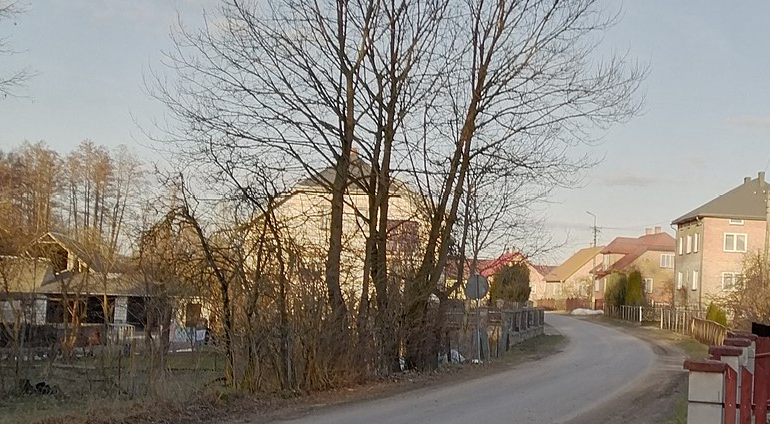

- Location within Poland
- Coordinates: 53°21′N 22°23′E
- Country: Poland
- Voivodeship: Podlaskie
- County: Łomża
- Gmina: Przytuły

Supy [ˈsupɨ] is a village in the administrative district of Gmina Przytuły, within Łomża County, Podlaskie Voivodeship, in north-eastern Poland.
