= Rybaki, Łomża County =

Rybaki
- Village
- Location within Poland
- Coordinates: 53°10′22″N 21°45′13″E
- Country: Poland
- Voivodeship: Podlaskie
- County: Łomża
- Gmina: Miastkowo
- Population (approx.): 120

Rybaki [rɨˈbaki] is a village in the administrative district of Gmina Miastkowo, within Łomża County, Podlaskie Voivodeship, in north-eastern Poland.
