= Tarnowo, Podlaskie Voivodeship =

Tarnowo
- Village
- Location within Poland
- Coordinates: 53°06′37″N 21°51′43″E
- Country: Poland
- Voivodeship: Podlaskie
- County: Łomża
- Gmina: Miastkowo

Tarnowo [tarˈnɔvɔ] is a village in the administrative district of Gmina Miastkowo, within Łomża County, Podlaskie Voivodeship, in north-eastern Poland.
