= Borawskie =

Borawskie may refer to the following places:

- Borawskie, Gmina Jedwabne in Podlaskie Voivodeship (north-east Poland)
- Borawskie, Gmina Przytuły in Podlaskie Voivodeship (north-east Poland)
- Borawskie, Warmian-Masurian Voivodeship (north Poland)
