= Kaimy =

- Village
- Location within Poland
- Coordinates: 53°16′49″N 22°16′09″E
- Country: Poland
- Voivodeship: Podlaskie
- County: Łomża
- Gmina: Jedwabne

Kaimy [kaimɨ] is a village in the administrative district of Gmina Jedwabne, within Łomża County, Podlaskie Voivodeship, in north-eastern Poland.
