= Korytki Leśne =

- Village
- Location within Poland
- Coordinates: 53°10′13″N 21°50′57″E
- Country: Poland
- Voivodeship: Podlaskie
- County: Łomża
- Gmina: Miastkowo

Korytki Leśne [kɔˈrɨtki ˈlɛɕnɛ] is a village in the administrative district of Gmina Miastkowo, within Łomża County, Podlaskie Voivodeship, in north-eastern Poland.
