= Kuleszka =

- Village
- Location within Poland
- Coordinates: 53°7′5″N 21°46′14″E
- Country: Poland
- Voivodeship: Podlaskie
- County: Łomża
- Gmina: Miastkowo

Kuleszka [kuˈlɛʂka] is a village in the administrative district of Gmina Miastkowo, within Łomża County, Podlaskie Voivodeship, in north-eastern Poland.
