= Siestrzanki =

- Village
- Location within Poland
- Coordinates: 53°19′N 22°24′E
- Country: Poland
- Voivodeship: Podlaskie
- County: Łomża
- Gmina: Jedwabne
- Area: 4.41 km^{2} (1.70 sq mi)
- Population (2011): 81
  - Density: 18/km^{2} (48/sq mi)

Siestrzanki [ɕɛsˈtʂaŋki] is a village in the administrative district of Gmina Jedwabne, within Łomża County, Podlaskie Voivodeship, in north-eastern Poland. It is approximately 8 km (5 mi) north-east of Jedwabne, 27 km (17 mi) north-east of Łomża and 56 km (35 mi) north-west of the regional capital Białystok.

Cities, towns and places near Siestrzanki include Witynie, Kucze Male-Trzcianka, Konopki Chude and Kucze Duze. The closest major cities are Sosnowiec, Bialystok, Hrodna and Torun.
