= Pieńki Okopne =

Village in Gmina Przytuły, Poland

- Village
- Location within Poland
- Coordinates: 53°21′12″N 22°23′56″E
- Country: Poland
- Voivodeship: Podlaskie
- County: Łomża
- Gmina: Przytuły

Pieńki Okopne [ˈpjɛɲki ɔˈkɔpnɛ] is a village in the administrative district of Gmina Przytuły, within Łomża County, Podlaskie Voivodeship, in north-eastern Poland.
