= Pawełki =

Pawełki may refer to the following places:

- Pawełki, Łomża County in Podlaskie Voivodeship (north-east Poland)
- Pawełki, Sokółka County in Podlaskie Voivodeship (north-east Poland)
- Pawełki, Silesian Voivodeship (south Poland)
