= Ruś, Podlaskie Voivodeship =

Ruś
- Village
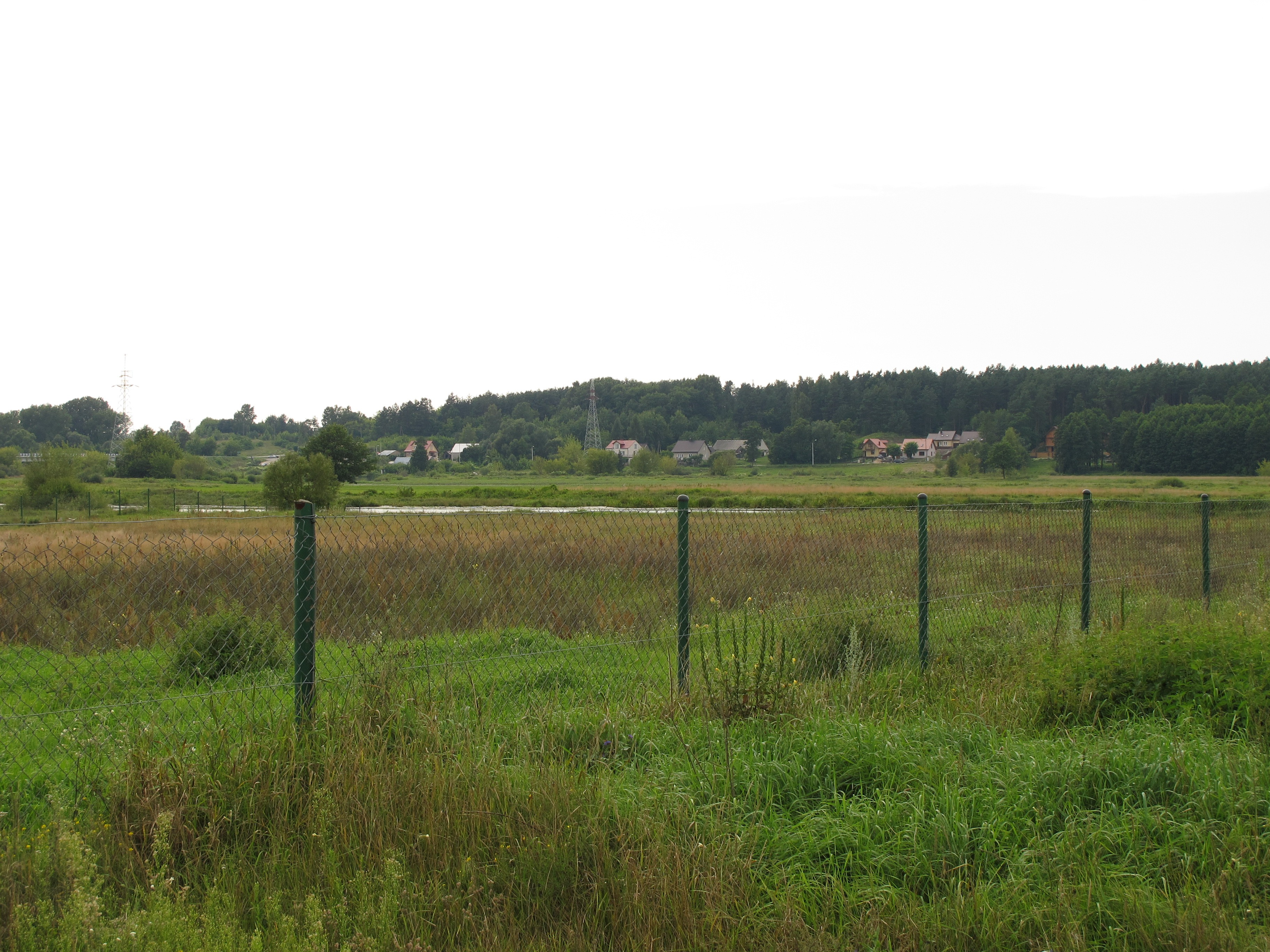

- Location within Poland
- Coordinates: 53°12′20″N 22°24′40″E
- Country: Poland
- Voivodeship: Podlaskie
- County: Łomża
- Gmina: Wizna

Ruś [ruɕ] is a village in the administrative district of Gmina Wizna, within Łomża County, Podlaskie Voivodeship, in north-eastern Poland.
