= Orlo (disambiguation) =

The Orlo was an early American motor car.

Orlo or Orło may also refer to:

== Places ==
- Orło, Masovian Voivodeship (east-central Poland)
- Orło, Podlaskie Voivodeship (north-east Poland)
- Orło, Warmian-Masurian Voivodeship (north Poland)

== People ==
- Orlo M. Brees (1896–1980), New York politician
