= Naruszczki =

- Village
- Location within Poland
- Coordinates: 53°08′59″N 21°54′48″E
- Country: Poland
- Voivodeship: Podlaskie
- County: Łomża
- Gmina: Miastkowo

Naruszczki [naˈruʂt͡ʂki] is a village in the administrative district of Gmina Miastkowo, within Łomża County, Podlaskie Voivodeship, in north-eastern Poland.
