= Czartoria, Podlaskie Voivodeship =

Czartoria
- Village
- Location within Poland
- Coordinates: 53°11′21″N 21°47′17″E
- Country: Poland
- Voivodeship: Podlaskie
- County: Łomża
- Gmina: Miastkowo
- Time zone: UTC+1 (CET)
  - Summer (DST): UTC+2 (CEST)

Czartoria [t͡ʂarˈtɔrja] is a village in the administrative district of Gmina Miastkowo, within Łomża County, Podlaskie Voivodeship, in north-eastern Poland.

== History ==
Three Polish citizens were murdered by Nazi Germany in the village during World War II.
