= Grądy, Łomża County =

Grądy
- Village
- Location within Poland
- Coordinates: 53°10′42″N 21°52′42″E
- Country: Poland
- Voivodeship: Podlaskie
- County: Łomża
- Gmina: Nowogród

Grądy [ˈɡrɔndɨ] is a village in the administrative district of Gmina Nowogród, within Łomża County, Podlaskie Voivodeship, in north-eastern Poland.
