= Kubrzany =

- Village
- Location within Poland
- Coordinates: 53°19′N 22°19′E
- Country: Poland
- Voivodeship: Podlaskie
- County: Łomża
- Gmina: Jedwabne

Kubrzany [kuˈbʐanɨ] is a village in the administrative district of Gmina Jedwabne, within Łomża County, Podlaskie Voivodeship, in northeastern Poland.
