= Sulki, Podlaskie Voivodeship =

Sulki
- Village
- Location within Poland
- Coordinates: 53°09′31″N 21°53′42″E
- Country: Poland
- Voivodeship: Podlaskie
- County: Łomża
- Gmina: Miastkowo

Sulki [ˈsulki] is a village in the administrative district of Gmina Miastkowo, within Łomża County, Podlaskie Voivodeship, in north-eastern Poland.
