= Włochówka =

- Village
- Location within Poland
- Coordinates: 53°11′31″N 22°25′13″E
- Country: Poland
- Voivodeship: Podlaskie
- County: Łomża
- Gmina: Wizna

Włochówka [vwɔˈxufka] is a village in the administrative district of Gmina Wizna, within Łomża County, Podlaskie Voivodeship, in north-eastern Poland.
