= Jarnuty, Gmina Wizna =

Jarnuty
- Village
- Location within Poland
- Coordinates: 53°14′55″N 22°22′03″E
- Country: Poland
- Voivodeship: Podlaskie
- County: Łomża
- Gmina: Wizna

Jarnuty [jarˈnutɨ] is a village in the administrative district of Gmina Wizna, within Łomża County, Podlaskie Voivodeship, in north-eastern Poland.
