= Srebrowo =

Village in Podlaskie, Poland

Srebrowo [srɛˈbrɔvɔ] is a village in the administrative district of Gmina Wizna, within Łomża County, Podlaskie Voivodeship, in north-eastern Poland.
