= Kramkowo =

- Village
- Location within Poland
- Coordinates: 53°12′N 22°21′E
- Country: Poland
- Voivodeship: Podlaskie
- County: Łomża
- Gmina: Wizna

Kramkowo [kramˈkɔvɔ] is a village in the administrative district of Gmina Wizna, within Łomża County, Podlaskie Voivodeship, in north-eastern Poland.

== History ==
Formerly a royal village, the village was located in the second half of the 16th century in the Wiska district of the Wiska land of Mazovia province.

According to the 1921 Population Census, the village was inhabited by 237 people, 236 were Roman Catholic and 1 was Orthodox. At the same time, 236 residents declared Polish nationality and 1 other. There were 32 residential buildings. The village belonged to the Roman Catholic parish in Vistula. It was subordinate to the Grodzki and District Court in Lomza; the relevant post office was located in Vidznia.

As a result of the USSR's invasion of Poland in September 1939, the town came under Soviet occupation. From June 1941, it was under German occupation. From July 22, 1941, until liberation it was included in the Bialystok District of the Third Reich.
