= Biodry-Kolonia =

- Village
- Location within Poland
- Coordinates: 53°20′05″N 22°25′10″E
- Country: Poland
- Voivodeship: Podlaskie
- County: Łomża
- Gmina: Jedwabne

Biodry-Kolonia [ˈbjɔdrɨ kɔˈlɔɲa] is a village in the administrative district of Gmina Jedwabne, within Łomża County, Podlaskie Voivodeship, in north-eastern Poland.
