= Kaliszki, Podlaskie Voivodeship =

Kaliszki
- Village
- Location within Poland
- Coordinates: 53°06′55″N 21°44′57″E
- Country: Poland
- Voivodeship: Podlaskie
- County: Łomża
- Gmina: Miastkowo

Kaliszki [kaˈliʂki] is a village in the administrative district of Gmina Miastkowo, within Łomża County, Podlaskie Voivodeship, in north-eastern Poland.

== See also ==
- Kaliszki
