= Chrostowo, Podlaskie Voivodeship =

Chrostowo
- Village
- Location within Poland
- Coordinates: 53°21′N 22°24′E
- Country: Poland
- Voivodeship: Podlaskie
- County: Łomża
- Gmina: Jedwabne

Chrostowo [xrɔsˈtɔvɔ] is a village in the administrative district of Gmina Jedwabne, within Łomża County, Podlaskie Voivodeship, in north-eastern Poland.
