= Kokoszki, Podlaskie Voivodeship =

Kokoszki
- Village
- Location within Poland
- Coordinates: 53°14′5″N 22°17′41″E
- Country: Poland
- Voivodeship: Podlaskie
- County: Łomża
- Gmina: Wizna

Population
  - Total: 100
- Time zone: UTC+1 (CET)
  - Summer (DST): UTC+2 (CEST)

Kokoszki [kɔˈkɔʂki] is a village in the administrative district of Gmina Wizna, within Łomża County, Podlaskie Voivodeship, in north-eastern Poland.

== History ==
Three Polish citizens were murdered by Nazi Germany in the village during World War II.
