= Grzymały =

Grzymały may refer to:

- Grzymały, Masovian Voivodeship (east-central Poland)
- Grzymały, Łomża County in Podlaskie Voivodeship (north-east Poland)
- Grzymały, Zambrów County in Podlaskie Voivodeship (north-east Poland)
