= Bronaki-Olki =

- Village
- Location within Poland
- Coordinates: 53°15′20″N 22°16′01″E
- Country: Poland
- Voivodeship: Podlaskie
- County: Łomża
- Gmina: Jedwabne

Bronaki-Olki [brɔˈnaki ˈɔlki] is a village in the administrative district of Gmina Jedwabne, within Łomża County, Podlaskie Voivodeship, in north-eastern Poland.
