= Nart, Podlaskie Voivodeship =

Nart
- Village
- Location within Poland
- Coordinates: 53°13′09″N 22°18′49″E
- Country: Poland
- Voivodeship: Podlaskie
- County: Łomża
- Gmina: Wizna

Nart [nart] is a village in the administrative district of Gmina Wizna, within Łomża County, Podlaskie Voivodeship, in north-eastern Poland.
