= Kąty, Łomża County =

Kąty
- Village
- Location within Poland
- Coordinates: 53°21′N 22°26′E
- Country: Poland
- Voivodeship: Podlaskie
- County: Łomża
- Gmina: Jedwabne

Kąty [ˈkɔntɨ] is a village in the administrative district of Gmina Jedwabne, within Łomża County, Podlaskie Voivodeship, in north-eastern Poland.
