= Jankowo-Młodzianowo =

Village in Gmina Nowogród

- Village
- Location within Poland
- Coordinates: 53°12′N 21°50′E
- Country: Poland
- Voivodeship: Podlaskie
- County: Łomża
- Gmina: Nowogród
- Population: 206

Jankowo-Młodzianowo [janˈkɔvɔ mwɔd͡ʑaˈnɔvɔ] is a village in the administrative district of Gmina Nowogród, within Łomża County, Podlaskie Voivodeship, in north-eastern Poland.
