= Obrytki, Łomża County =

Obrytki
- Village
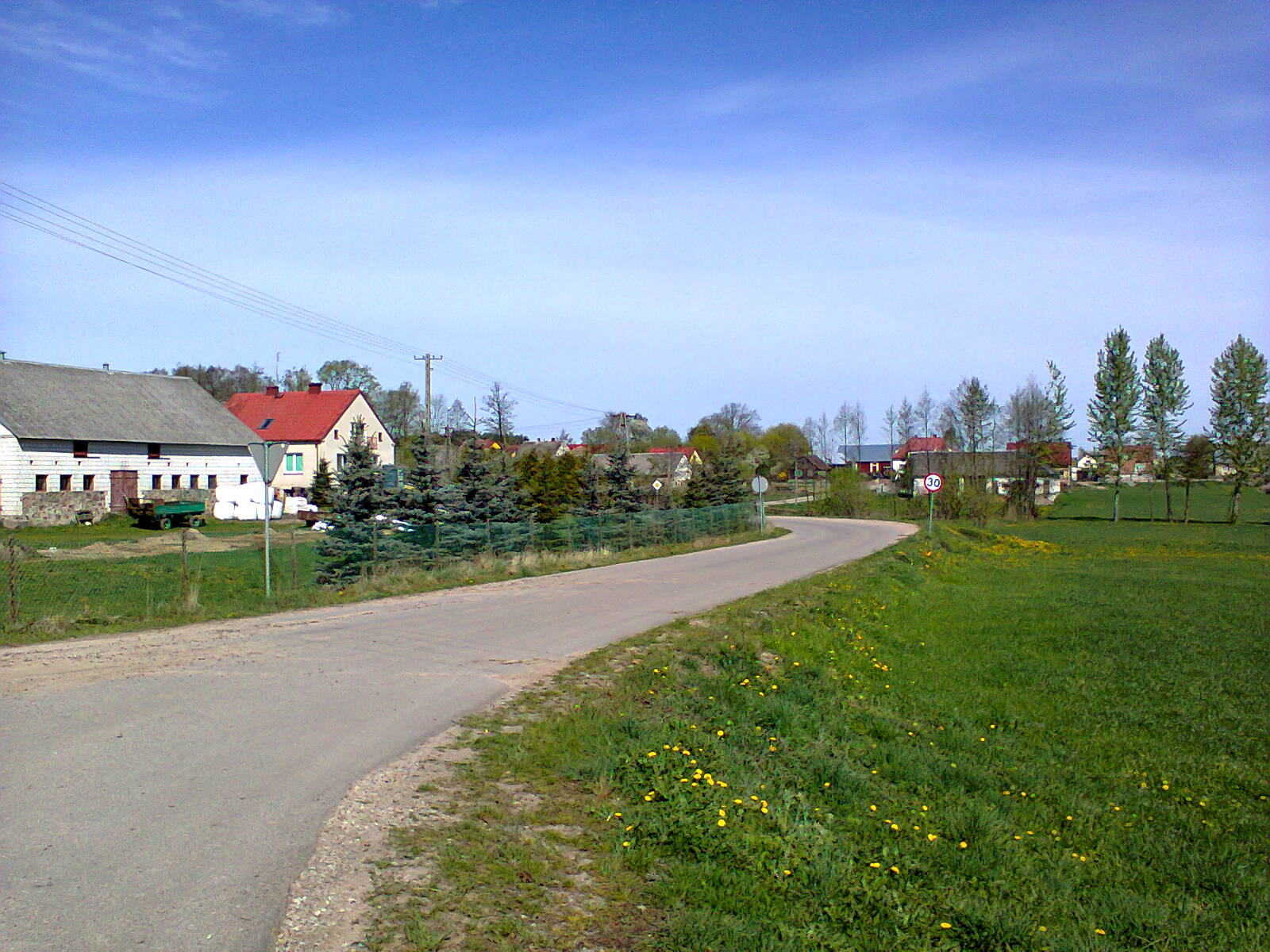
- Road in Obrytki

- Location within Poland
- Coordinates: 53°22′08″N 22°16′26″E
- Country: Poland
- Voivodeship: Podlaskie
- County: Łomża
- Gmina: Przytuły

Obrytki [ɔˈbrɨtki] is a village in the administrative district of Gmina Przytuły, within Łomża County, Podlaskie Voivodeship, in north-eastern Poland.
