= Kucze Małe =

- Village
- Location within Poland
- Coordinates: 53°18′N 22°22′E
- Country: Poland
- Voivodeship: Podlaskie
- County: Łomża
- Gmina: Jedwabne

Kucze Małe [ˈkut͡ʂɛ ˈmawɛ] is a village in the administrative district of Gmina Jedwabne, within Łomża County, Podlaskie Voivodeship, in north-eastern Poland.
