= Trzaski, Łomża County =

Trzaski
- Village
- Location within Poland
- Coordinates: 53°21′52″N 22°23′04″E
- Country: Poland
- Voivodeship: Podlaskie
- County: Łomża
- Gmina: Przytuły
- Population (approx.): 30

Trzaski [ˈtʂaski] is a village in the administrative district of Gmina Przytuły, within Łomża County, Podlaskie Voivodeship, in north-eastern Poland.
