= Boguszki =

Boguszki refers to the following places in Poland:

- Boguszki, Łomża County
- Boguszki, Mońki County
