= Rydzewo =

Rydzewo may refer to the following places:

- Rydzewo, Ciechanów County in Masovian Voivodeship (east-central Poland)
- Rydzewo, Grajewo County in Podlaskie Voivodeship (north-east Poland)
- Rydzewo, Łomża County in Podlaskie Voivodeship (north-east Poland)
- Rydzewo, Sierpc County in Masovian Voivodeship (east-central Poland)
- Rydzewo, Ełk County in Warmian-Masurian Voivodeship (north Poland)
- Rydzewo, Giżycko County in Warmian-Masurian Voivodeship (north Poland)
- Rydzewo, West Pomeranian Voivodeship (north-west Poland)
