= Wilamowo, Podlaskie Voivodeship =

Wilamowo
- Village
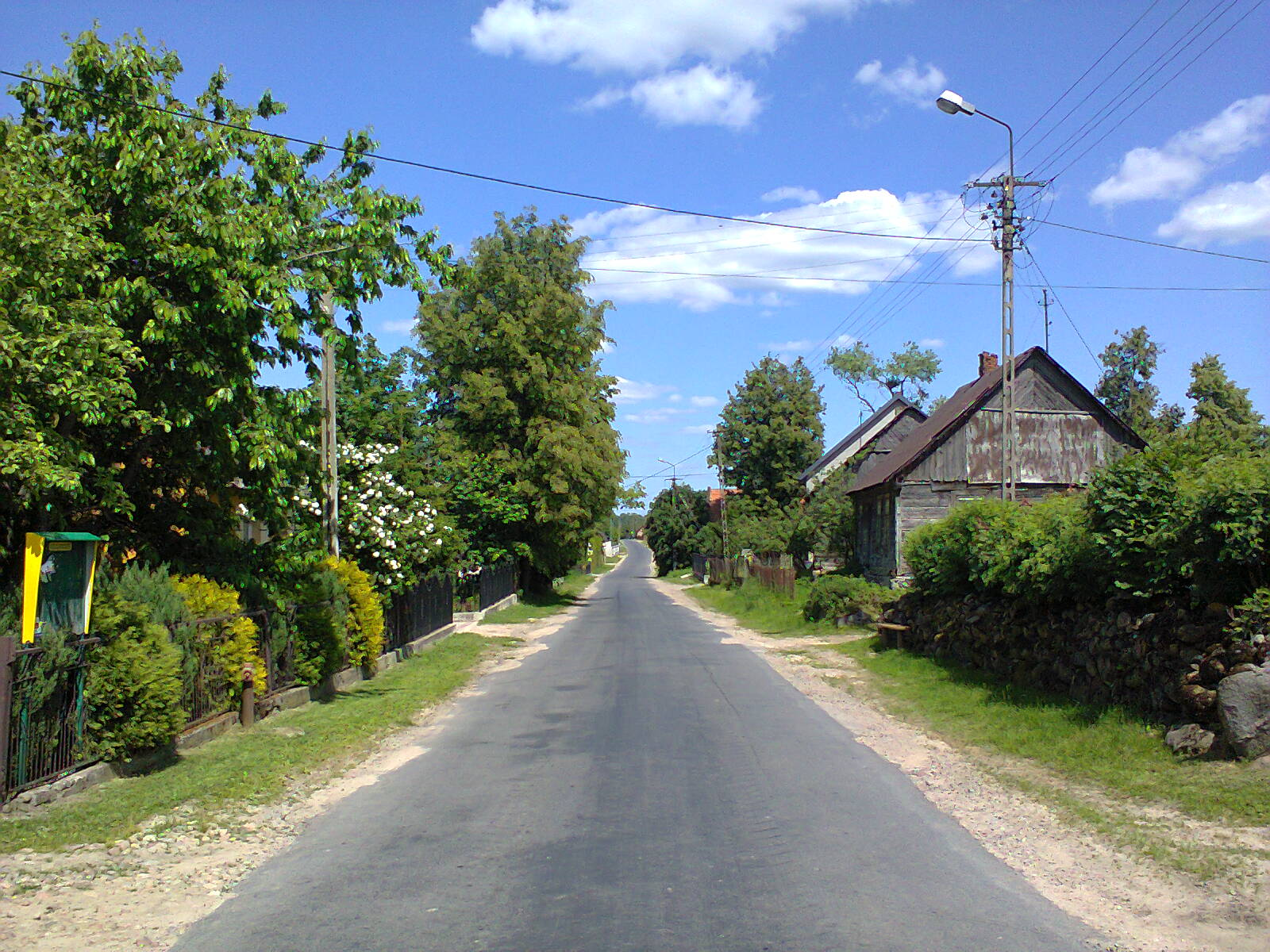

- Location within Poland
- Coordinates: 53°24′43″N 22°16′25″E
- Country: Poland
- Voivodeship: Podlaskie
- County: Łomża
- Gmina: Przytuły

Wilamowo [vilaˈmɔvɔ] is a village in the administrative district of Gmina Przytuły, within Łomża County, Podlaskie Voivodeship, in north-eastern Poland.
