= Małachowo, Podlaskie Voivodeship =

Małachowo
- Village
- Location within Poland
- Coordinates: 53°13′44″N 22°22′51″E
- Country: Poland
- Voivodeship: Podlaskie
- County: Łomża
- Gmina: Wizna

Małachowo [mawaˈxɔvɔ] is a village in the administrative district of Gmina Wizna, within Łomża County, Podlaskie Voivodeship, in north-eastern Poland.
