= Podosie, Podlaskie Voivodeship =

Podosie
- Village
- Location within Poland
- Coordinates: 53°4′53″N 21°50′58″E
- Country: Poland
- Voivodeship: Podlaskie
- County: Łomża
- Gmina: Miastkowo

Podosie [pɔˈdɔɕɛ] is a village in the administrative district of Gmina Miastkowo, within Łomża County, Podlaskie Voivodeship, in north-eastern Poland.
