= Olszewo-Góra =

- Village
- Location within Poland
- Coordinates: 53°20′02″N 22°15′39″E
- Country: Poland
- Voivodeship: Podlaskie
- County: Łomża
- Gmina: Jedwabne
- Population: 66

Olszewo-Góra [ɔlˈʂɛvɔ ˈɡura] is a village in the administrative district of Gmina Jedwabne, within Łomża County, Podlaskie Voivodeship, in north-eastern Poland.
