= Osetno =

Osetno may refer to the following places in Poland:

- Osetno, Lower Silesian Voivodeship (south-west Poland)
- Osetno, Podlaskie Voivodeship (north-east Poland)
- Osetno, Warmian-Masurian Voivodeship (north Poland)
- Osetno, West Pomeranian Voivodeship (north-west Poland)
