= Lipnik, Łomża County =

Lipnik
- Village
- Location within Poland
- Coordinates: 53°15′51″N 22°18′41″E
- Country: Poland
- Voivodeship: Podlaskie
- County: Łomża
- Gmina: Jedwabne

Lipnik (Polish pronunciation: [ˈlipɲik]) is a village in the administrative district of Gmina Jedwabne, within Łomża County, Podlaskie Voivodeship, in north-eastern Poland.
