= WAGI =

Wagi or WAGI may refer to:

- Wagi, Poland
- Wagi language
- WAGI-LP, a low-power radio station (97.5 FM) licensed to serve Kankakee, Illinois, United States

WAGI-LP is a ministry of First Assembly of God Church in Kankakee, IL. The station went live in September 2014. WAGI-LP is a contemporary praise and worship station and goes by the name Praise FM.

- WOSF, a radio station (105.3 FM) licensed to serve Gaffney, South Carolina, United States, which held the call sign WAGI-FM from 1971 to 2007
