= Kucze Wielkie =

- Village
- Location within Poland
- Coordinates: 53°17′44″N 22°21′48″E
- Country: Poland
- Voivodeship: Podlaskie
- County: Łomża
- Gmina: Jedwabne

Kucze Wielkie pronounced [ˈkut͡ʂɛ ˈvjɛlkʲɛ] (also known as Kucze Duże) is a village in the administrative district of Gmina Jedwabne, within Łomża County, Podlaskie Voivodeship, in north-eastern Poland. Kucze is located some 148 kilometres (92 mi) North-East of Warsaw in the historical region of Mazowsze (Masovia in English), on the outskirts of the Biebrza National Park.

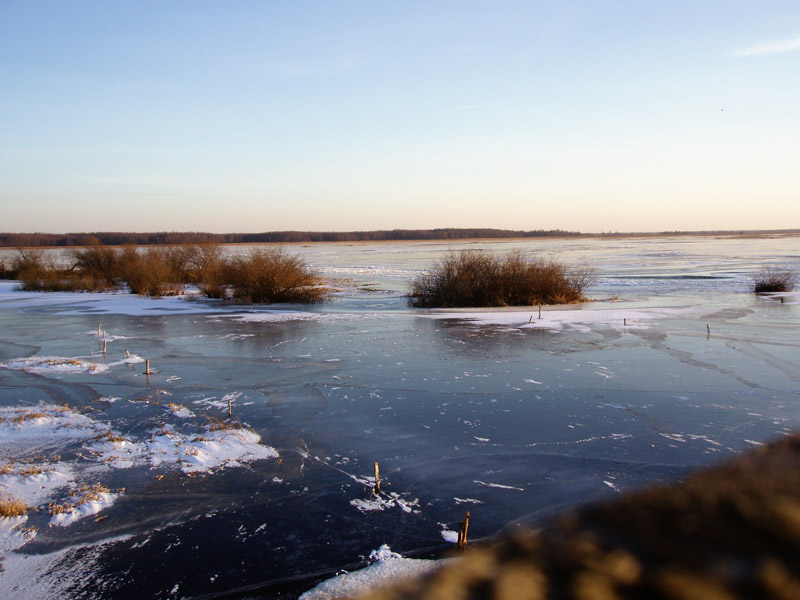
Biebrza River, not far from Kucze Wielkie
