= Kuberski =

Kuberski (feminine: Kuberska; plural: Kuberscy) is a habitational or toponymical surname for someone from Stara Kubra in Podlaskie Voivodeship or Kubery in Łódź Voivodeship.

Notable people with the surname include:

- Bob Kuberski (born 1971), American football player
- Steve Kuberski (born 1947), American basketball player
- Joanna Kuberska (born 1992), Polish film actress
- Refael Kubersky (born 2000), investigative reporter and 2024-25 FRONTLINE Tow Journalism Fellow
