= Bagienice =

Bagienice may refer to:

- Bagienice, Masovian Voivodeship (east-central Poland)
- Bagienice, Grajewo County in Podlaskie Voivodeship (north-east Poland)
- Bagienice, Łomża County in Podlaskie Voivodeship (north-east Poland)
- Bagienice, Warmian-Masurian Voivodeship (north Poland)
