= Przestrzele, Łomża County =

Village in Gmina Jedwabne, Poland

Przestrzele
- Village
- Location within Poland
- Coordinates: 53°17′31″N 22°20′41″E
- Country: Poland
- Voivodeship: Podlaskie
- County: Łomża
- Gmina: Jedwabne

Przestrzele [pʂɛsˈtʂɛlɛ] is a village in the administrative district of Gmina Jedwabne, within Łomża County, Podlaskie Voivodeship, in north-eastern Poland.
