= Kajetanowo, Podlaskie Voivodeship =

Kajetanowo
- Village
- Location within Poland
- Coordinates: 53°17′47″N 22°19′16″E
- Country: Poland
- Voivodeship: Podlaskie
- County: Łomża
- Gmina: Jedwabne

Kajetanowo [kajɛtaˈnɔvɔ] is a village in the administrative district of Gmina Jedwabne, within Łomża County, Podlaskie Voivodeship, in north-eastern Poland.
