= Mroczki, Łomża County =

Mroczki
- Village
- Location within Poland
- Coordinates: 53°24′13″N 22°19′05″E
- Country: Poland
- Voivodeship: Podlaskie
- County: Łomża
- Gmina: Przytuły

Mroczki (Polish pronunciation: [ˈmrɔt͡ʂkʲi]) is a village in the administrative district of Gmina Przytuły, within Łomża County, Podlaskie Voivodeship, in north-eastern Poland.
