= Rusiniec =

- Village
- Location within Poland
- Coordinates: 53°12′29″N 22°24′49″E
- Country: Poland
- Voivodeship: Podlaskie
- County: Łomża
- Gmina: Wizna

Rusiniec [ruˈɕiɲɛt͡s] is a village in the administrative district of Gmina Wizna, within Łomża County, Podlaskie Voivodeship, in north-eastern Poland.
