= Kubra-Przebudówka =

- Village
- Location within Poland
- Coordinates: 53°22′09″N 22°21′24″E
- Country: Poland
- Voivodeship: Podlaskie
- County: Łomża
- Gmina: Przytuły

Kubra-Przebudówka [ˈkubra pʂɛbuˈdufka] is a village in the administrative district of Gmina Przytuły, within Łomża County, Podlaskie Voivodeship, in north-eastern Poland.
