= Sosnowiec, Podlaskie Voivodeship =

Sosnowiec
- Village
- Location within Poland
- Coordinates: 53°8′N 21°48′E
- Country: Poland
- Voivodeship: Podlaskie
- County: Łomża
- Gmina: Miastkowo

Sosnowiec (pronounced [sɔsˈnɔvjɛts]) is a village in the administrative district of Gmina Miastkowo, within Łomża County, Podlaskie Voivodeship, in north-eastern Poland.
