= Witkowo, Podlaskie Voivodeship =

Witkowo
- Village
- Location within Poland
- Coordinates: 53°11′50″N 22°23′49″E
- Country: Poland
- Voivodeship: Podlaskie
- County: Łomża
- Gmina: Wizna

Witkowo [vitˈkɔvɔ] is a village in the administrative district of Gmina Wizna, within Łomża County, Podlaskie Voivodeship, in north-eastern Poland.
