= Kotówek =

- Village
- Location within Poland
- Coordinates: 53°14′N 22°18′E
- Country: Poland
- Voivodeship: Podlaskie
- County: Łomża
- Gmina: Jedwabne
- Population: 70

Kotówek [kɔˈtuvɛk] is a village in the administrative district of Gmina Jedwabne, within Łomża County, Podlaskie Voivodeship, in north-eastern Poland.
