= Doliwy, Podlaskie Voivodeship =

Doliwy
- Village
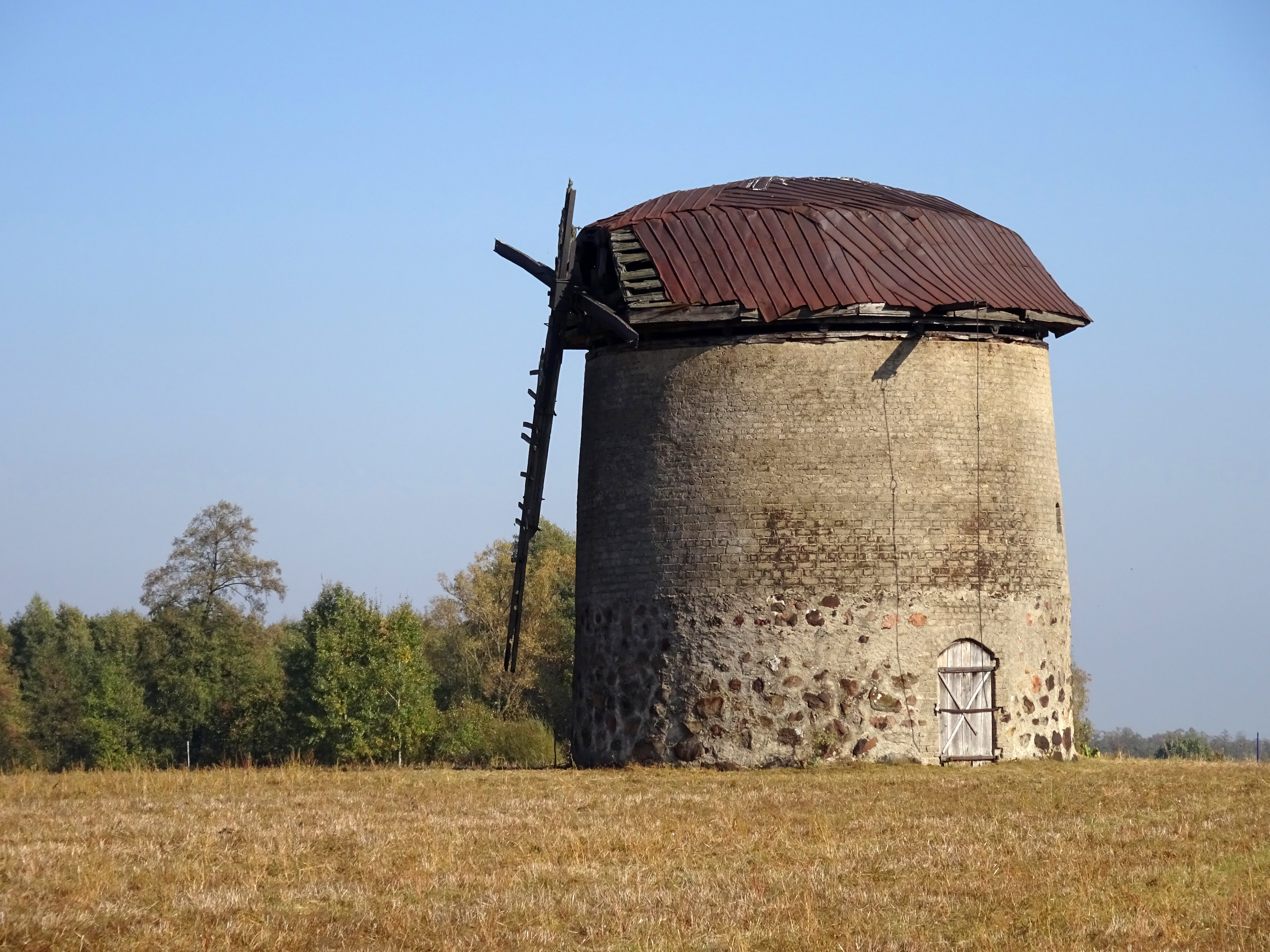

- Location within Poland
- Coordinates: 53°24′N 22°19′E
- Country: Poland
- Voivodeship: Podlaskie
- County: Łomża
- Gmina: Przytuły

Doliwy [dɔˈlivɨ] is a village in the administrative district of Gmina Przytuły, within Łomża County, Podlaskie Voivodeship, in north-eastern Poland.
