= Sławiec =

- Village
- Location within Poland
- Coordinates: 53°12′N 21°55′E
- Country: Poland
- Voivodeship: Podlaskie
- County: Łomża
- Gmina: Nowogród
- Time zone: UTC+1 (CET)
  - Summer (DST): UTC+2 (CEST)
- Vehicle registration: BLM

Sławiec [ˈswavjɛt͡s] is a village in the administrative district of Gmina Nowogród, within Łomża County, Podlaskie Voivodeship, in north-eastern Poland.

After the joint German-Soviet invasion of Poland, which started World War II, the village was occupied by the Soviet Union from 1939 to 1941, and then by Nazi Germany from 1941 to 1944. In 1943, the Germans massacred around 300 people in Sławiec, whom they previously imprisoned in nearby Łomża. Among the victims were inhabitants of the nearby towns of Zambrów and Wysokie Mazowieckie. There is a memorial at the site.
