= Nowe Bożejewo =

Village in Gmina Wizna, Poland

- Village
- Location within Poland
- Coordinates: 53°12′12″N 22°16′20″E
- Country: Poland
- Voivodeship: Podlaskie
- County: Łomża
- Gmina: Wizna

Nowe Bożejewo [ˈnɔvɛ bɔʐɛˈjɛvɔ] is a village in the administrative district of Gmina Wizna, within Łomża County, Podlaskie Voivodeship, in north-eastern Poland.
