= Biczki =

- Village
- Location within Poland
- Coordinates: 53°18′32″N 22°17′41″E
- Country: Poland
- Voivodeship: Podlaskie
- County: Łomża
- Gmina: Jedwabne

Biczki [ˈbit͡ʂki] is a village in the administrative district of Gmina Jedwabne, within Łomża County, Podlaskie Voivodeship, in north-eastern Poland.
