= Kotowo-Plac =

- Village
- Location within Poland
- Coordinates: 53°15′27″N 22°19′04″E
- Country: Poland
- Voivodeship: Podlaskie
- County: Łomża
- Gmina: Jedwabne

Kotowo-Plac [kɔˈtɔvɔ ˈplat͡s] is a village in the administrative district of Gmina Jedwabne, within Łomża County, Podlaskie Voivodeship, in north-eastern Poland.
