= Cendrowizna =

- Village
- Location within Poland
- Coordinates: 53°08′32″N 21°50′11″E
- Country: Poland
- Voivodeship: Podlaskie
- County: Łomża
- Gmina: Miastkowo

Cendrowizna [t͡sɛndrɔˈvizna] is a village in the administrative district of Gmina Miastkowo, within Łomża County, Podlaskie Voivodeship, in north-eastern Poland.
