= Grzymki =

- Village
- Location within Poland
- Coordinates: 53°23′25″N 22°16′18″E
- Country: Poland
- Voivodeship: Podlaskie
- County: Łomża
- Gmina: Przytuły

Grzymki [ˈɡʐɨmki] is a village in the administrative district of Gmina Przytuły, within Łomża County, Podlaskie Voivodeship, in north-eastern Poland.

It was the birthplace (1807) of Wincenty Gostkowski who later in life emigrated to Switzerland and became prominent in watchmaking.
