= Korytki =

Korytki may refer to the following places:

- Korytki, Łomża County in Podlaskie Voivodeship (north-east Poland)
- Korytki, Suwałki County in Podlaskie Voivodeship (north-east Poland)
- Korytki, Warmian-Masurian Voivodeship (north Poland)
