= Gardoty =

- Village
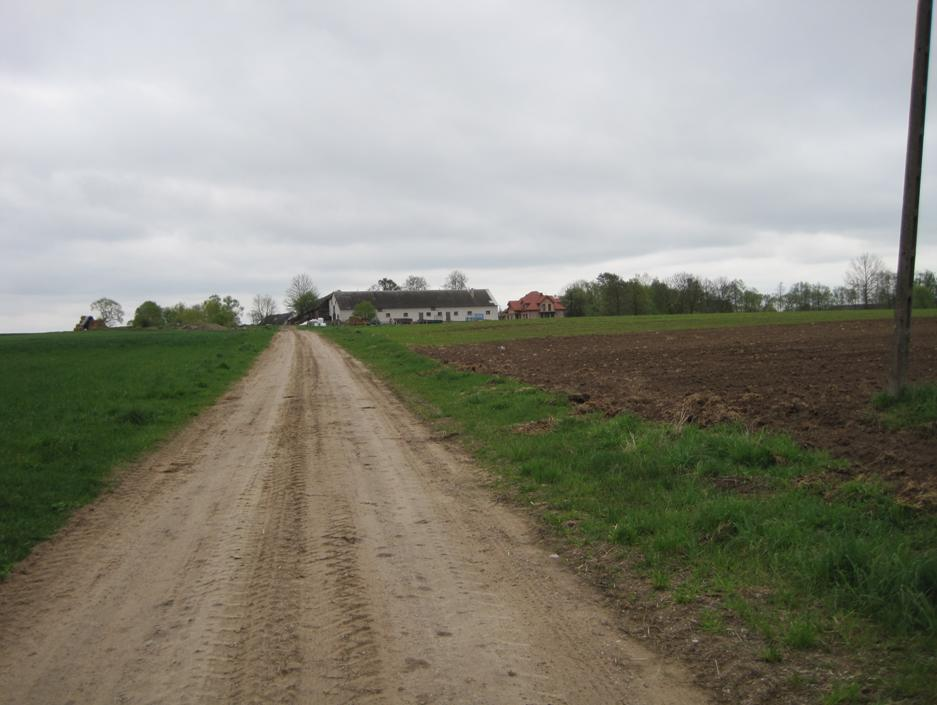

- Location within Poland
- Coordinates: 53°23′35″N 22°17′26″E
- Country: Poland
- Voivodeship: Podlaskie
- County: Łomża
- Gmina: Przytuły

Gardoty [ɡarˈdɔtɨ] is a village in the administrative district of Gmina Przytuły within Łomża County, Podlaskie Voivodeship, in north-eastern Poland.
