= Łuby-Kiertany =

Village in Gmina Miastkowo, Poland

- Village
- Location within Poland
- Coordinates: 53°08′26″N 21°52′37″E
- Country: Poland
- Voivodeship: Podlaskie
- County: Łomża
- Gmina: Miastkowo

Łuby-Kiertany [ˈwubɨ kʲɛrˈtanɨ] is a village in the administrative district of Gmina Miastkowo, within Łomża County, Podlaskie Voivodeship, in north-eastern Poland.
