= Nowiny =

Nowiny may refer to:

- Nowiny, Lower Silesian Voivodeship (south-west Poland)
- Nowiny, Włocławek County in Kuyavian-Pomeranian Voivodeship (north-central Poland)
- Nowiny, Żnin County in Kuyavian-Pomeranian Voivodeship (north-central Poland)
- Nowiny, Chełm County in Lublin Voivodeship (east Poland)
- Nowiny, Krasnystaw County in Lublin Voivodeship (east Poland)
- Nowiny, Hajnówka County in Podlaskie Voivodeship (north-east Poland)
- Nowiny, Łomża County in Podlaskie Voivodeship (north-east Poland)
- Nowiny, Lublin County in Lublin Voivodeship (east Poland)
- Nowiny, Gmina Będków in Łódź Voivodeship (central Poland)
- Nowiny, Gmina Żelechlinek in Łódź Voivodeship (central Poland)
- Nowiny, Radzyń County in Lublin Voivodeship (east Poland)
- Nowiny, Ryki County in Lublin Voivodeship (east Poland)
- Nowiny, Świdnik County in Lublin Voivodeship (east Poland)
- Nowiny, Gmina Susiec in Lublin Voivodeship (east Poland)
- Nowiny, Włodawa County in Lublin Voivodeship (east Poland)
- Nowiny, Włoszczowa County in Świętokrzyskie Voivodeship (south-central Poland)
- Nowiny, Subcarpathian Voivodeship (south-east Poland)
- Nowiny, Kozienice County in Masovian Voivodeship (east-central Poland)
- Nowiny, Gmina Leoncin in Masovian Voivodeship (east-central Poland)
- Nowiny, Gmina Nasielsk in Masovian Voivodeship (east-central Poland)
- Nowiny, Gostyń County in Greater Poland Voivodeship (west-central Poland)
- Nowiny, Kalisz County in Greater Poland Voivodeship (west-central Poland)
- Nowiny, Konin County in Greater Poland Voivodeship (west-central Poland)
- Nowiny, Złotów County in Greater Poland Voivodeship (west-central Poland)
- Nowiny, Silesian Voivodeship (south Poland)
- Nowiny, Lubusz Voivodeship (west Poland)
- Nowiny, Człuchów County in Pomeranian Voivodeship (north Poland)
- Nowiny, Gdańsk County in Pomeranian Voivodeship (north Poland)
- Nowiny, Kartuzy County in Pomeranian Voivodeship (north Poland)
- Nowiny, Kościerzyna County in Pomeranian Voivodeship (north Poland)
- Nowiny, Gmina Sztum in Pomeranian Voivodeship (north Poland)
- Nowiny, Gmina Dzierzgoń in Pomeranian Voivodeship (north Poland)
- Nowiny, Wejherowo County in Pomeranian Voivodeship (north Poland)
- Nowiny, Braniewo County in Warmian-Masurian Voivodeship (north Poland)
- Nowiny, Elbląg County in Warmian-Masurian Voivodeship (north Poland)
- Nowiny, Gołdap County in Warmian-Masurian Voivodeship (north Poland)
- Nowiny, Szczytno County in Warmian-Masurian Voivodeship (north Poland)
- Nowiny, West Pomeranian Voivodeship (north-west Poland)
- Nowiny, Kielce County in Świętokrzyskie Voivodeship (central Poland)
