= Sławiec Dworski =

- Village
- Location within Poland
- Coordinates: 53°11′09″N 21°55′19″E
- Country: Poland
- Voivodeship: Podlaskie
- County: Łomża
- Gmina: Nowogród

Sławiec Dworski (Polish pronunciation: [ˈswavjɛdz ˈdvɔrskʲi]) is a village in the administrative district of Gmina Nowogród, within Łomża County, Podlaskie Voivodeship, in north-eastern Poland.
