= Morgowniki =

- Village
- Location within Poland
- Coordinates: 53°14′N 21°53′E
- Country: Poland
- Voivodeship: Podlaskie
- County: Łomża
- Gmina: Nowogród

Morgowniki [mɔrɡɔvˈniki] is a village in the administrative district of Gmina Nowogród, within Łomża County, Podlaskie Voivodeship, in north-eastern Poland.
