= Podkosacze =

- Village
- Location within Poland
- Coordinates: 53°9′3″N 22°17′6″E
- Country: Poland
- Voivodeship: Podlaskie
- County: Łomża
- Gmina: Wizna

Podkosacze [pɔtkɔˈsat͡ʂɛ] is a village in the administrative district of Gmina Wizna, within Łomża County, Podlaskie Voivodeship, in north-eastern Poland.
