= Kolonia Nowogrodzka =

- Village
- Location within Poland
- Coordinates: 53°09′49″N 21°45′49″E
- Country: Poland
- Voivodeship: Podlaskie
- County: Łomża
- Gmina: Miastkowo

Kolonia Nowogrodzka [kɔˈlɔɲa nɔvɔˈɡrɔt͡ska] is a village in the administrative district of Gmina Miastkowo, within Łomża County, Podlaskie Voivodeship, in north-eastern Poland.
