= Kossaki =

Kossaki may refer to the following places:

- Kossaki, Masovian Voivodeship (east-central Poland)
- Kossaki, Kolno County in Podlaskie Voivodeship (north-east Poland)
- Kossaki, Łomża County in Podlaskie Voivodeship (north-east Poland)
