= Kraska, Podlaskie Voivodeship =

Kraska
- Village
- Location within Poland
- Coordinates: 53°06′41″N 21°53′32″E
- Country: Poland
- Voivodeship: Podlaskie
- County: Łomża
- Gmina: Miastkowo

Kraska [ˈkraska] is a village in the administrative district of Gmina Miastkowo, within Łomża County, Podlaskie Voivodeship, in north-eastern Poland.
