= Janczewo, Gmina Jedwabne =

Janczewo
- Village
- Location within Poland
- Coordinates: 53°16′N 22°15′E
- Country: Poland
- Voivodeship: Podlaskie
- County: Łomża
- Gmina: Jedwabne
- Population: 82

Janczewo [janˈt͡ʂɛvɔ] is a village in the administrative district of Gmina Jedwabne, within Łomża County, Podlaskie Voivodeship, in north-eastern Poland.
