= Orło, Podlaskie Voivodeship =

Village in Gmina Miastkowo, Poland

Orło
- Village
- Location within Poland
- Coordinates: 53°08′30″N 21°42′39″E
- Country: Poland
- Voivodeship: Podlaskie
- County: Łomża
- Gmina: Miastkowo

Orło [ˈɔrwɔ] is a village in the administrative district of Gmina Miastkowo, within Łomża County, Podlaskie Voivodeship, in north-eastern Poland.
