= Sieburczyn =

- Village
- Location within Poland
- Coordinates: 53°14′N 22°27′E
- Country: Poland
- Voivodeship: Podlaskie
- County: Łomża
- Gmina: Wizna

Sieburczyn [ɕɛˈburt͡ʂɨn] is a village in the administrative district of Gmina Wizna, within Łomża County, Podlaskie Voivodeship, in north-eastern Poland.
