= Grzymały, Łomża County =

Grzymały
- Village
- Location within Poland
- Coordinates: 53°11′44″N 21°55′49″E
- Country: Poland
- Voivodeship: Podlaskie
- County: Łomża
- Gmina: Nowogród

Grzymały [ɡʐɨˈmawɨ] is a village in the administrative district of Gmina Nowogród, within Łomża County, Podlaskie Voivodeship, in north-eastern Poland.
