= Kaliszki =

Kaliszki may refer to the following places:

- Kaliszki, Łódź Voivodeship (central Poland)
- Kaliszki, Masovian Voivodeship (east-central Poland)
- Kaliszki, Podlaskie Voivodeship (north-east Poland)
- Kaliszki, Warmian-Masurian Voivodeship (north Poland)
