= Wincenty Gostkowski =

Wincenty Gostkowski (March 29, 1807 – August 29, 1884) was a lawyer and associate of Antoni Patek and Adrien Philippe in the watchmaker Patek Philippe & Co. in Geneva, Switzerland.

Gostkowski was born in Grzymki, Poland. He became the financier of Antoni Patek's watchmaking business in Geneva that in 1851 became Patek Philippe & Co.

On June 30, 1847, at the age of 40, he married a Frenchwoman Marie-Antoinette de Rabaudy from Brest, twenty years his junior. For this marriage, Antoni Norbert de Patek and Jean Adrien Philippe were two of three witnesses. Gostkowski had two sons, one of whom, Wawrzyniec, he educated in watchmaking

Wincenty Gotkowski retired from Patek Philippe & Co. on January 21, 1876. He died in 1884 in Geneva; his wife Marie-Antoinette outlived him twenty-four years.
