= Nowiny, Łomża County =

Nowiny
- Village
- Location within Poland
- Coordinates: 53°16′29″N 22°18′59″E
- Country: Poland
- Voivodeship: Podlaskie
- County: Łomża
- Gmina: Jedwabne

Nowiny [nɔˈvinɨ] is a village in the administrative district of Gmina Jedwabne, within Łomża County, Podlaskie Voivodeship, in north-eastern Poland.
