= Gmina Jedwabne =

Gmina Jedwabne Jedwabne Commune
- Gmina
- Coat of arms

- Gmina Jedwabne within the Łomża County
- Coordinates (Jedwabne): 53°17′N 22°18′E
- Country: Poland
- Voivodeship: Podlaskie
- County: Łomża County
- Seat: Jedwabne

Area
  - Total: 159.42 km^{2} (61.55 sq mi)

Population (2011)
  - Total: 5,596
  - Density: 35.10/km^{2} (90.91/sq mi)
  - Urban: 1,871
  - Rural: 3,725
- Website: http://www.jedwabne.pl/

Gmina Jedwabne is an urban-rural gmina (administrative district) in Łomża County, Podlaskie Voivodeship, in north-eastern Poland. Its seat is the town of Jedwabne, which lies approximately 20 kilometres (12 mi) north-east of Łomża and 61 km (38 mi) west of the regional capital Białystok.

The gmina covers an area of 159.42 square kilometres (61.6 sq mi), and as of 2006 its total population is 5,552 (out of which the population of Jedwabne amounts to 1,901, and the population of the rural part of the gmina is 3,651).

== Villages ==
Apart from the town of Jedwabne, Gmina Jedwabne contains the villages and settlements of Bartki, Biczki, Biodry, Biodry-Kolonia, Borawskie, Bronaki-Olki, Bronaki-Pietrasze, Brzostowo, Burzyn, Boguszki Chrostowo, Chyliny, Grabnik, Grądy Małe, Grądy Wielkie, Janczewko, Janczewo, Kąciki, Kaimy, Kajetanowo, Kamianki, Karwowo-Wszebory, Kąty, Koniecki, Konopki Chude, Konopki Tłuste, Korytki, Kossaki, Kotówek, Kotowo Stare, Kotowo-Plac, Kubrzany, Kucze Małe, Kucze Wielkie, Kuczewskie, Lipnik, Makowskie, Mocarze, Nadbory, Nowa Wieś, Nowiny, Olszewo-Góra, Orlikowo, Pawełki, Pieńki Borowe, Pluty, Przestrzele, Rostki, Siestrzanki, Stryjaki, Szostaki and Witynie.

== Neighbouring gminas ==
Gmina Jedwabne is bordered by the gminas of Piątnica, Przytuły, Radziłów, Stawiski, Trzcianne and Wizna.
