= Gmina Miastkowo =

Gmina Miastkowo Miastkowo Commune
- Gmina
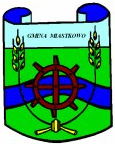
- Coat of arms

- Gmina Miastkowo within the Łomża County
- Coordinates (Miastkowo): 53°10′N 21°49′E
- Country: Poland
- Voivodeship: Podlaskie
- County: Łomża County
- Seat: Miastkowo

Area
  - Total: 114.84 km^{2} (44.34 sq mi)

Population (2011)
  - Total: 4,350
  - Density: 37.9/km^{2} (98.1/sq mi)
- Website: http://www.miastkowo.pl/

Gmina Miastkowo is a rural gmina (administrative district) in Łomża County, Podlaskie Voivodeship, in north-eastern Poland. Its seat is the village of Miastkowo, which lies approximately 18 kilometres (11 mi) west of Łomża and 91 km (57 mi) west of the regional capital Białystok.

The gmina covers an area of 114.84 square kilometres (44.3 sq mi), and as of 2006 its total population is 4,306 (4,350 in 2011).

== Villages ==
Gmina Miastkowo contains the villages and settlements of Bartkowizna, Cendrowizna, Czartoria, Drogoszewo, Gałkówka, Kaliszki, Kolonia Nowogrodzka, Korytki Leśne, Kraska, Kuleszka, Leopoldowo, Łubia, Łuby-Kiertany, Łuby-Kurki, Miastkowo, Naruszczki, Nowosiedliny, Orło, Osetno, Podosie, Rybaki, Rydzewo, Rydzewo-Gozdy, Sosnowiec, Sulki, Tarnowo and Zaruzie.

== Neighbouring gminas ==
Gmina Miastkowo is bordered by the gminas of Lelis, Łomża, Nowogród, Rzekuń, Śniadowo, Troszyn and Zbójna.
