= Gmina Nowogród =

Gmina Nowogród Nowogród Commune
- Gmina
- Coat of arms

- Gmina Nowogród within the Łomża County
- Coordinates (Nowogród): 53°13′35″N 21°52′46″E
- Country: Poland
- Voivodeship: Podlaskie
- County: Łomża County
- Seat: Nowogród

Area
  - Total: 100.98 km^{2} (38.99 sq mi)

Population (2011)
  - Total: 4,170
  - Density: 41.3/km^{2} (107/sq mi)
  - Urban: 2,195
  - Rural: 1,975
- Website: http://www.nowogrod.com/

Gmina Nowogród is an urban-rural gmina (administrative district) in Łomża County, Podlaskie Voivodeship, in north-eastern Poland. Its seat is the town of Nowogród, which lies approximately 16 kilometres (10 mi) north-west of Łomża and 87 km (54 mi) west of the regional capital Białystok.

The gmina covers an area of 100.98 square kilometres (39.0 sq mi), and as of 2006 its total population is 3,977 (out of which the population of Nowogród amounts to 2,014, and the population of the rural part of the gmina is 1,963).

== Villages ==
Apart from the town of Nowogród, Gmina Nowogród contains the villages and settlements of Baliki, Chmielewo, Dzierzgi, Grądy, Grzymały, Jankowo-Młodzianowo, Jankowo-Skarbowo, Kupnina, Mątwica, Morgowniki, Ptaki, Serwatki, Sławiec, Sławiec Dworski, Sulimy and Szablak.

== Neighbouring gminas ==
Gmina Nowogród is bordered by the gminas of Łomża, Mały Płock, Miastkowo and Zbójna.
