= Szostaki, Łomża County =

Szostaki
- Village
- Location within Poland
- Coordinates: 53°17′01″N 22°27′22″E
- Country: Poland
- Voivodeship: Podlaskie
- County: Łomża
- Gmina: Jedwabne

Szostaki [ʂɔsˈtaki] is a village in the administrative district of Gmina Jedwabne, within Łomża County, Podlaskie Voivodeship, in north-eastern Poland.
