= Boguszki, Łomża County =

Boguszki
- Village
- Location within Poland
- Coordinates: 53°14′50″N 22°20′57″E
- Country: Poland
- Voivodeship: Podlaskie
- County: Łomża
- Gmina: Wizna
- Population: 40

Boguszki [bɔˈɡuʂki] is a village in the administrative district of Gmina Wizna, within Łomża County, Podlaskie Voivodeship, in north-eastern Poland.
