= Janczewo, Gmina Wizna =

Janczewo
- Village
- Location within Poland
- Coordinates: 53°10′21″N 22°18′23″E
- Country: Poland
- Voivodeship: Podlaskie
- County: Łomża
- Gmina: Wizna

Janczewo [janˈt͡ʂɛvɔ] is a village in the administrative district of Gmina Wizna, within Łomża County, Podlaskie Voivodeship, in north-eastern Poland.
