= Łubia =

Village in Gmina Miastkowo, Poland

- Village
- Location within Poland
- Coordinates: 53°06′34″N 21°49′07″E
- Country: Poland
- Voivodeship: Podlaskie
- County: Łomża
- Gmina: Miastkowo

Łubia [ˈwubja] is a village in the administrative district of Gmina Miastkowo, within Łomża County, Podlaskie Voivodeship, in north-eastern Poland.
