= Korytki, Łomża County =

Korytki
- Village
- Location within Poland
- Coordinates: 53°16′48″N 22°15′47″E
- Country: Poland
- Voivodeship: Podlaskie
- County: Łomża
- Gmina: Jedwabne

Korytki [kɔˈrɨtki] is a village in the administrative district of Gmina Jedwabne, within Łomża County, Podlaskie Voivodeship, in north-eastern Poland.
