= Ptaki, Łomża County =

Ptaki
- Village
- Location within Poland
- Coordinates: 53°14′27″N 21°52′22″E
- Country: Poland
- Voivodeship: Podlaskie
- County: Łomża
- Gmina: Nowogród
- Population: 20

Ptaki [ˈptaki] is a village in the administrative district of Gmina Nowogród, within Łomża County, Podlaskie Voivodeship, in north-eastern Poland.
