= Chmielewo, Łomża County =

Chmielewo
- Village
- Location within Poland
- Coordinates: 53°11′08″N 21°51′24″E
- Country: Poland
- Voivodeship: Podlaskie
- County: Łomża
- Gmina: Nowogród

Chmielewo [xmjɛˈlɛvɔ] is a village in the administrative district of Gmina Nowogród, within Łomża County, Podlaskie Voivodeship, in north-eastern Poland.
