= Borawskie, Gmina Jedwabne =

Borawskie
- Village
- Location within Poland
- Coordinates: 53°19′19″N 22°22′5″E
- Country: Poland
- Voivodeship: Podlaskie
- County: Łomża
- Gmina: Jedwabne

Borawskie [bɔˈrafskʲɛ] is a village in the administrative district of Gmina Jedwabne, within Łomża County, Podlaskie Voivodeship, in north-eastern Poland.
