= Brzostowo, Podlaskie Voivodeship =

Brzostowo
- Village
- Location within Poland
- Coordinates: 53°19′1″N 22°27′18″E
- Country: Poland
- Voivodeship: Podlaskie
- County: Łomża
- Gmina: Jedwabne

Brzostowo [bʐɔsˈtɔvɔ] is a village in the administrative district of Gmina Jedwabne, within Łomża County, Podlaskie Voivodeship, in north-eastern Poland.
