= Przytuły, Podlaskie Voivodeship =

Przytuły
- Village
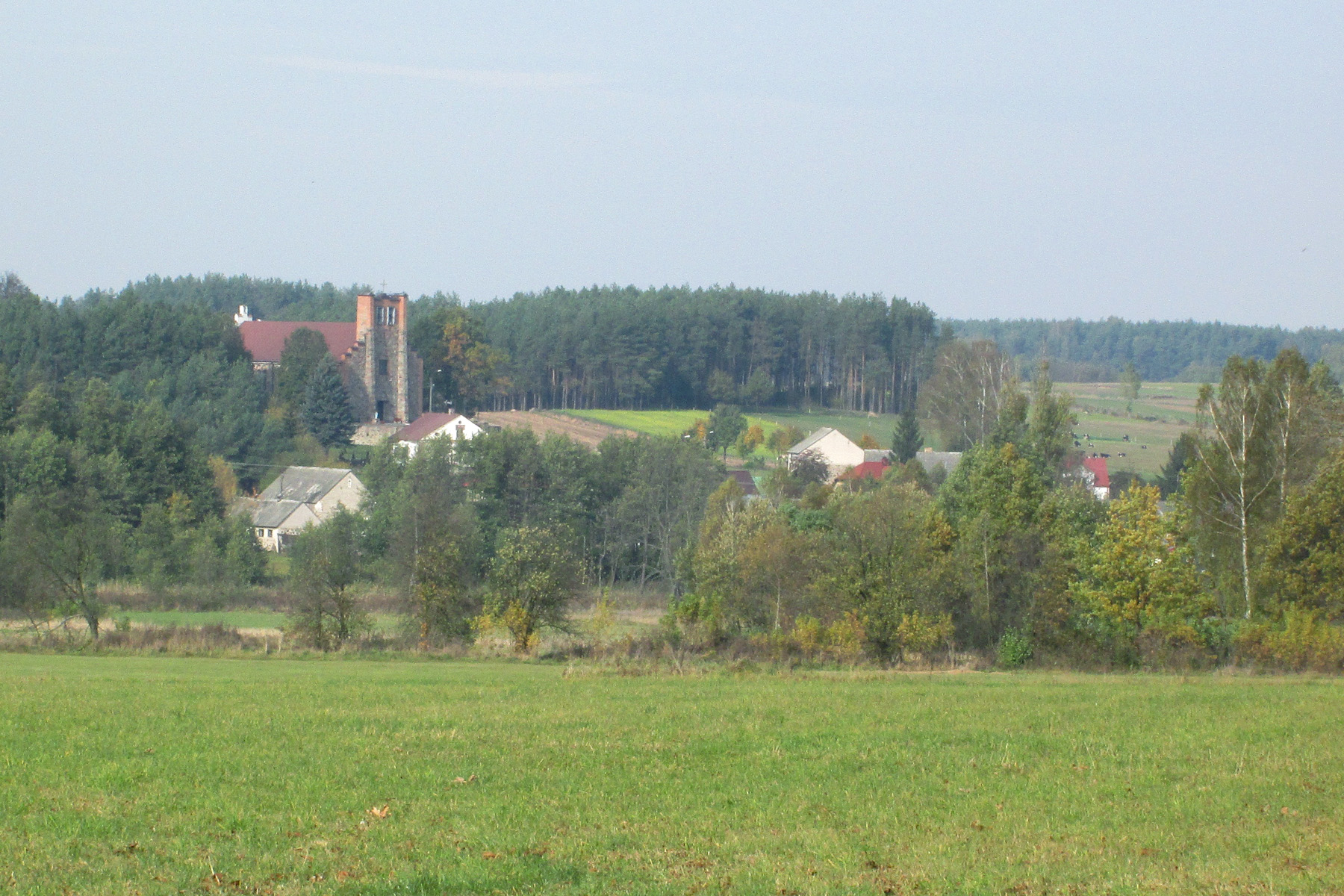

- Location within Poland
- Coordinates: 53°22′3″N 22°18′35″E
- Country: Poland
- Voivodeship: Podlaskie
- County: Łomża
- Gmina: Przytuły
- Population: 230

Przytuły [pʂɨˈtuwɨ] is a village in Łomża County, Podlaskie Voivodeship, in north-eastern Poland. It is the seat of the gmina (administrative district) called Gmina Przytuły.
