= Gmina Przytuły =

Gmina Przytuły Przytuły Commune
- Gmina
- Gmina Przytuły within the Łomża County
- Coordinates (Przytuły): 53°22′3″N 22°18′35″E
- Country: Poland
- Voivodeship: Podlaskie
- County: Łomża County
- Seat: Przytuły

Area
  - Total: 71.18 km^{2} (27.48 sq mi)

Population (2011)
  - Total: 2,194
  - Density: 30.82/km^{2} (79.83/sq mi)

Gmina Przytuły is a rural gmina (administrative district) in Łomża County, Podlaskie Voivodeship, in north-eastern Poland. Its seat is the village of Przytuły, which lies approximately 27 kilometres (17 mi) north-east of Łomża and 64 km (40 mi) north-west of the regional capital Białystok.

The gmina covers an area of 71.18 square kilometres (27.5 sq mi), and as of 2006 its total population is 2,170 (2,194 in 2011).

== Villages ==
Gmina Przytuły contains the villages and settlements of Bagienice, Borawskie, Chrzanowo, Doliwy, Gardoty, Grzymki, Kubra-Przebudówka, Mieczki, Mroczki, Nowa Kubra, Obrytki, Pieńki Okopne, Przytuły, Przytuły-Kolonia, Przytuły-Las, Stara Kubra, Supy, Trzaski, Wagi and Wilamowo.

== Neighbouring gminas ==
Gmina Przytuły is bordered by the gminas of Grabowo, Jedwabne, Radziłów, Stawiski and Wąsosz.
