= Nowa Kubra =

- Village
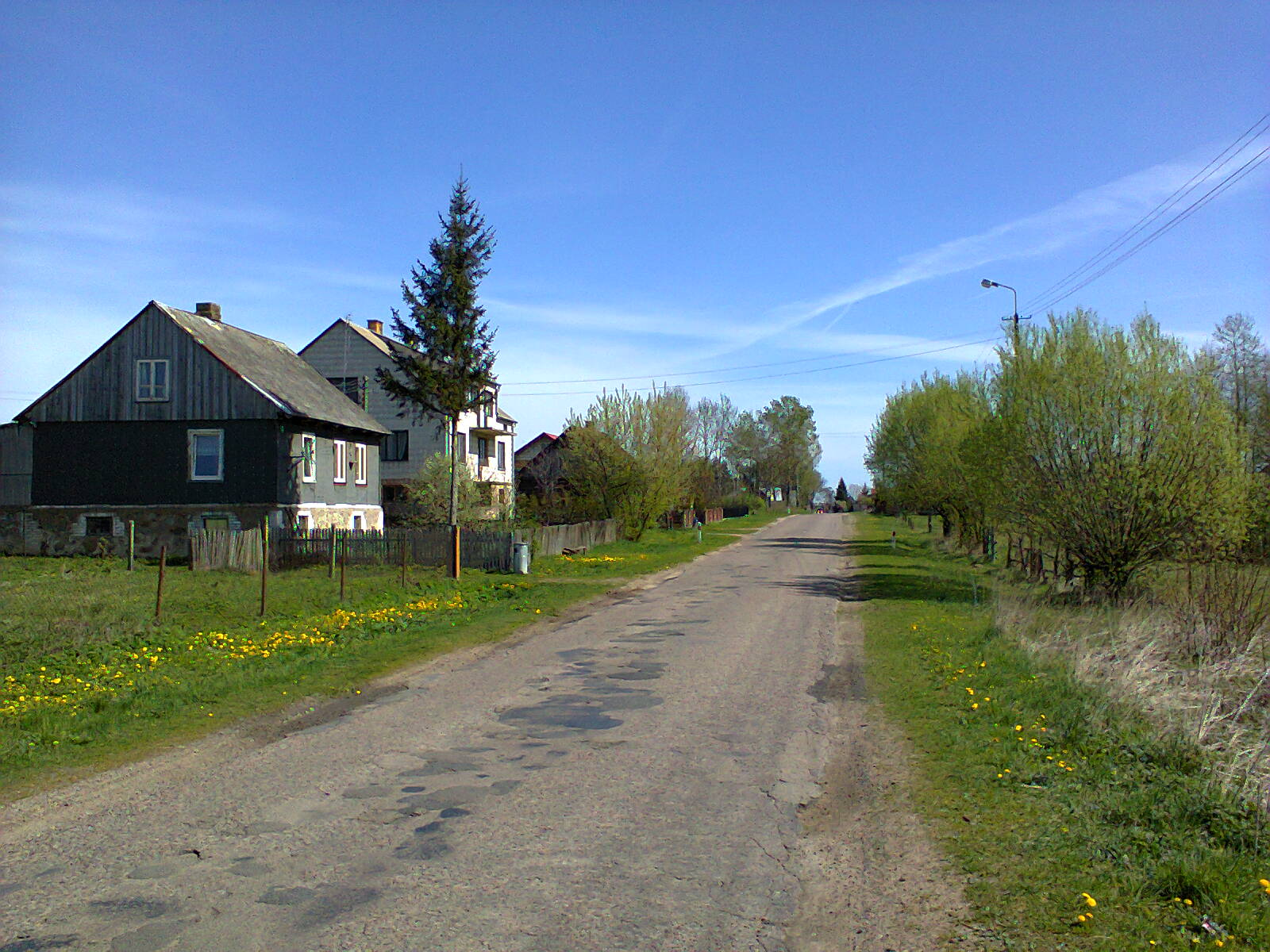
- Street of Nowa Kubra

- Location within Poland
- Coordinates: 53°22′55″N 22°19′51″E
- Country: Poland
- Voivodeship: Podlaskie
- County: Łomża
- Gmina: Przytuły

Nowa Kubra [ˈnɔva ˈkubra] is a village in the administrative district of Gmina Przytuły, within Łomża County, Podlaskie Voivodeship, in north-eastern Poland.
