= Bagienice, Łomża County =

Bagienice
- Village
- Location within Poland
- Coordinates: 53°21′22″N 22°14′35″E
- Country: Poland
- Voivodeship: Podlaskie
- County: Łomża
- Gmina: Przytuły

Bagienice (Polish pronunciation: [baɡʲɛˈɲitsɛ]) is a village in the administrative district of Gmina Przytuły, within Łomża County, Podlaskie Voivodeship, in north-eastern Poland.
