= Miastkowo =

- Village
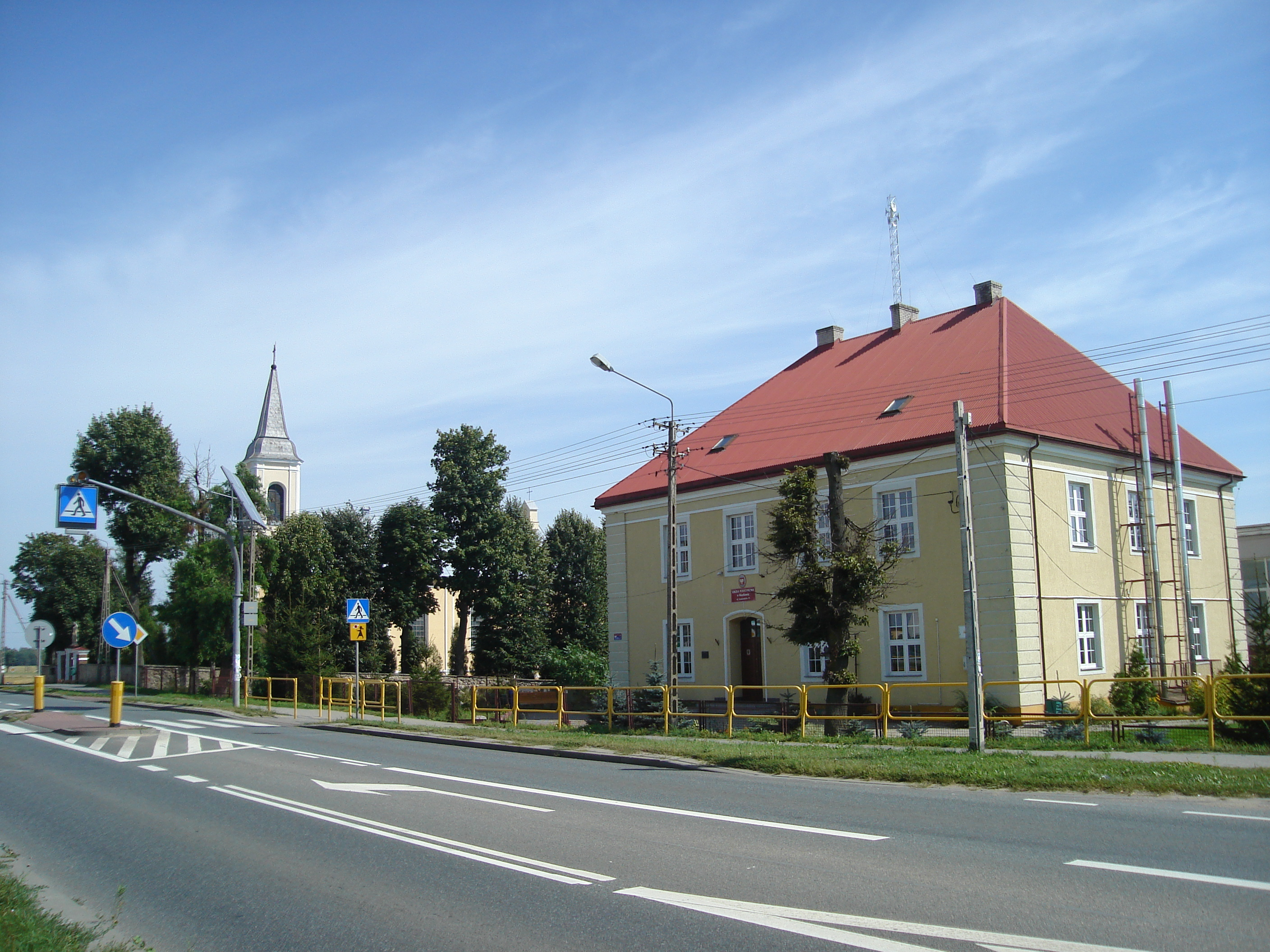
- Primary school (on the right) and Our Lady of the Rosary church (on the left)

- Location within Poland
- Coordinates: 53°10′N 21°49′E
- Country: Poland
- Voivodeship: Podlaskie
- County: Łomża
- Gmina: Miastkowo

Population
  - Total: 1,000
- Time zone: UTC+1 (CET)
  - Summer (DST): UTC+2 (CEST)
- Vehicle registration: BLM
- Website: www.miastkowo.pl

Miastkowo [mjastˈkɔvɔ] is a village in Łomża County, Podlaskie Voivodeship, in north-eastern Poland. It is the seat of the gmina (administrative district) called Gmina Miastkowo.

== History ==
Miastkowo was mentioned in 1413 as the seat of the Miastkowski noble family. A church and parish were founded in 1451 by Dukes from the Masovian line of the Polish Piast dynasty. In 1827, the village had a population of 270. There are graves of Polish troops killed in the Polish–Soviet War in 1920 at the local cemetery.

During World War II, the settlement was occupied by the Soviet Union from 1939 to 1941, and by Nazi Germany from 1941 to 1944. The German Nazi government operated a penal forced labour camp in the village. Its prisoners were mostly inhabitants of Miastkowo and nearby villages. During the Holocaust, local Pole Józef Dąbkowski managed to hide and rescue nine Jews from the Germans. In December 1942, Polish partisans of the Home Army launched an attack on a German gendarmerie post in Miastkowo.

== Notable people ==
- Marian Oleś (1934–2005), Polish priest and apostolic nuncio
