= Kamianki, Łomża County =

Kamianki
- Village
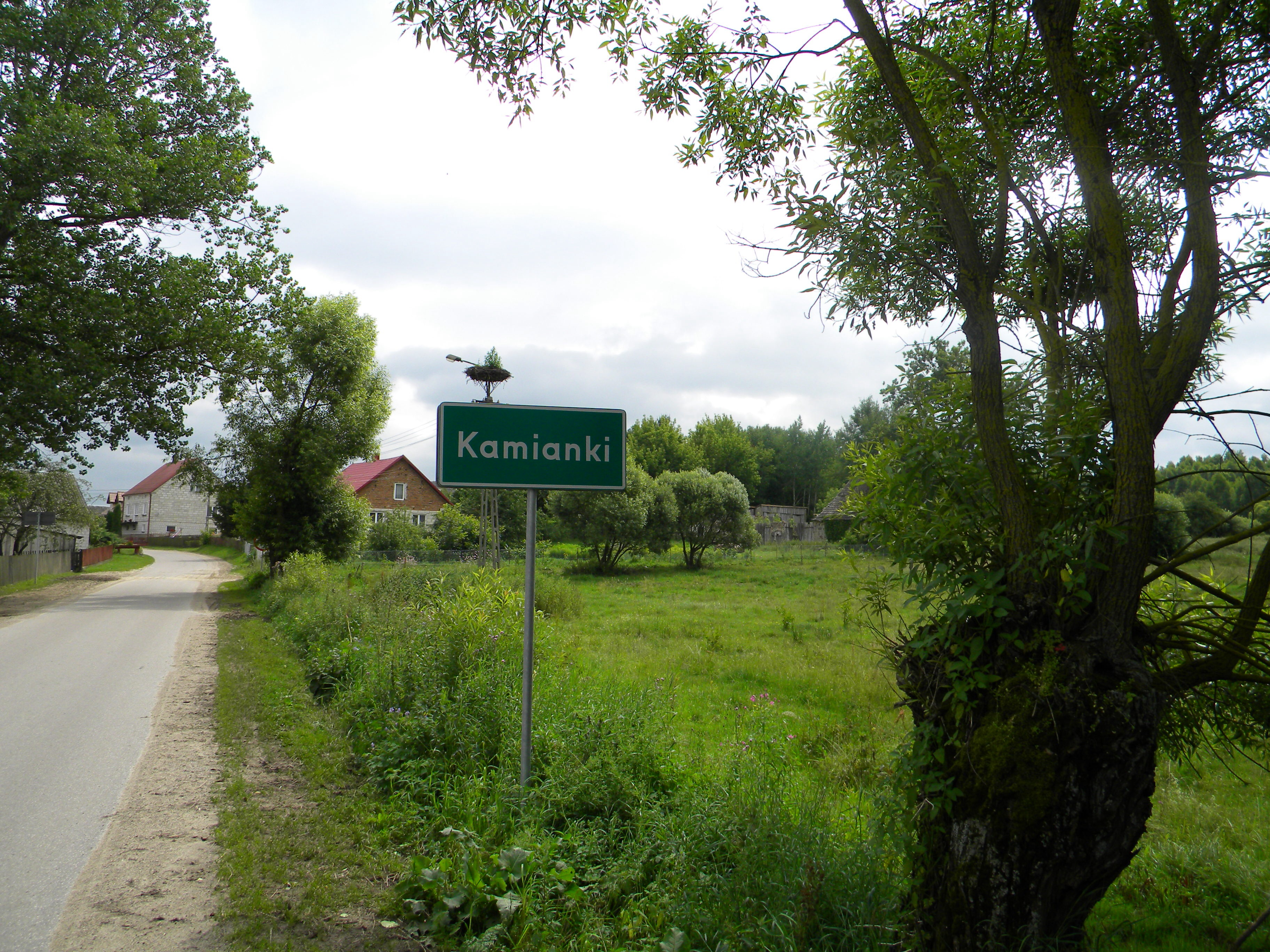
- Kamianki, direction Jedwabne - Burzyn

- Location within Poland
- Coordinates: 53°16′17″N 22°22′56″E
- Country: Poland
- Voivodeship: Podlaskie
- County: Łomża
- Gmina: Jedwabne

Kamianki [kaˈmjanki] is a village in the administrative district of Gmina Jedwabne, within Łomża County, Podlaskie Voivodeship, in north-eastern Poland.
