= Gmina Wizna =

Gmina Wizna Wizna Commune
- Gmina
- Flag Coat of arms

- Gmina Wizna within the Łomża County
- Coordinates (Wizna): 53°12′N 22°23′E
- Country: Poland
- Voivodeship: Podlaskie
- County: Łomża County
- Seat: Wizna

Area
  - Total: 133.05 km^{2} (51.37 sq mi)

Population (2011)
  - Total: 4,344
  - Density: 32.65/km^{2} (84.56/sq mi)
- Website: http://www.wizna.pl

Gmina Wizna is a rural gmina (administrative district) in Łomża County, Podlaskie Voivodeship, in north-eastern Poland. Its seat is the village of Wizna, which lies approximately 21 kilometres (13 mi) east of Łomża and 54 km (34 mi) west of the regional capital Białystok.

The gmina covers an area of 133.05 square kilometres (51.4 sq mi), and as of 2006 its total population was 4,313 (4,344 in 2011).

The gmina contains part of the protected area called Łomża Landscape Park.

== Villages ==
Gmina Wizna contains the villages and settlements of Boguszki, Bronowo, Janczewo, Jarnuty, Kokoszki, Kramkowo, Lisno, Małachowo, Męczki, Mrówki, Nart, Nieławice, Niwkowo, Nowe Bożejewo, Podkosacze, Ruś, Rusiniec, Rutki, Rutkowskie, Sambory, Sieburczyn, Srebrowo, Stare Bożejewo, Wierciszewo, Witkowo, Wizna, Włochówka and Zanklewo.

== Neighbouring gminas ==
Gmina Wizna is bordered by the gminas of Jedwabne, Łomża, Piątnica, Rutki, Trzcianne and Zawady.
