= Jedwabne Synagogue =

Synagogue in Jedwabne, Poland (1770–1913)

Coordinates: 53.286°N 22.302°E

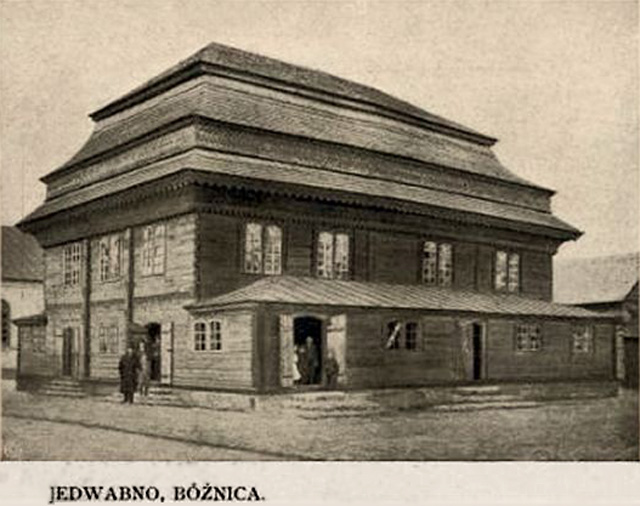
Jedwabne Synagogue

The Jedwabne Synagogue (Yiddish: Yedwabne Shul) was a Jewish synagogue located in the small town of Jedwabne, Poland. Built in 1770, it was an example of vernacular architecture and one of many wooden synagogues unique to the former Polish–Lithuanian Commonwealth. The layered, pitched roof visible in surviving exterior photographs conceals a series of massive trusses from which the great dome is suspended. The roof, which features three well-defined stages, is considered one of the most architecturally complex and interesting of wooden synagogue roofs. The synagogue was enlarged in the nineteenth century by the addition of one story extensions on each side for the use of the women of the community.

The synagogue was destroyed in an accidental fire in 1913.

Immigrants from Jedwabne built the synagogue Congregation Anshe Yedwabne at 242 Henry Street on the Lower East Side of Manhattan in New York City.

== See also ==
- Jedwabne pogrom
