= Rydzewo, Łomża County =

Rydzewo
- Village
- Location within Poland
- Coordinates: 53°8′10″N 21°43′57″E
- Country: Poland
- Voivodeship: Podlaskie
- County: Łomża
- Gmina: Miastkowo

Rydzewo [rɨˈd͡zɛvɔ] is a village in the administrative district of Gmina Miastkowo, within Łomża County, Podlaskie Voivodeship, in north-eastern Poland.
