= Borawskie, Gmina Przytuły =

Borawskie
- Village
- Location within Poland
- Coordinates: 53°21′18″N 22°16′55″E
- Country: Poland
- Voivodeship: Podlaskie
- County: Łomża
- Gmina: Przytuły

Borawskie [bɔˈrafskʲɛ] is a village in the administrative district of Gmina Przytuły, within Łomża County, Podlaskie Voivodeship, in north-eastern Poland.
