= Osetno, Podlaskie Voivodeship =

Osetno
- Village
- Location within Poland
- Coordinates: 53°10′N 21°44′E
- Country: Poland
- Voivodeship: Podlaskie
- County: Łomża
- Gmina: Miastkowo

Osetno [ɔˈsɛtnɔ] is a village in the administrative district of Gmina Miastkowo, within Łomża County, Podlaskie Voivodeship, in north-eastern Poland.
