= Stara Kubra =

- Village
- Location within Poland
- Coordinates: 53°22′46″N 22°20′04″E
- Country: Poland
- Voivodeship: Podlaskie
- County: Łomża
- Gmina: Przytuły

Stara Kubra [ˈstara ˈkubra] is a village in the administrative district of Gmina Przytuły, within Łomża County, Podlaskie Voivodeship, in north-eastern Poland.
