= Grzegorz Borawski =

Polish footballer born

Personal information
- Date of birth: 2 November 1967 (age 58)
- Place of birth: Czechowice-Dziedzice, Poland
- Position: Midfielder

Senior career*
Years	Team	Apps	(Gls)
1985–1987	GKS Jastrzębie	10	(0)
1988–1992	Naprzód Rydułtowy		
1992–1998	GKS Katowice	152	(10)
1999	GKS Jastrzębie		
1999	Beskid Skoczów		
2002–2003	LKS Skrbeńsko		

Managerial career
- 2000–2002: Rozwój Katowice
- 2002: Walcownia Czechowice-Dziedzice
- 2002–2003: BKS Stal Bielsko-Biała
- * Club domestic league appearances and goals

Grzegorz Borawski (born 2 November 1967) is a Polish former professional footballer who played as a defender.

== Career ==
Borawski began playing club football with GKS Jastrzębie in the II Liga. Next, he moved to Naprzód Rydułtowy where Borawski was a key part of the team's midfield as they reached the II Liga.

In 1992, Borawski joined Ekstraklasa side GKS Katowice where he would enjoy the best spell of his career until he suffered a devastating leg injury in 1997.

After Borawski retired from playing football, he became a coach. He was appointed manager of lower-league side Walcownia Czechowice-Dziedzice in 2002. Borawski also managed Rozwój Katowice and BKS Bielsko-Biała.

== Honours ==
GKS Katowice

- Polish Cup: 1992–93
- Polish Super Cup: 1995
