= Jedwabne =

Town in Podlaskie Voivodeship, Poland

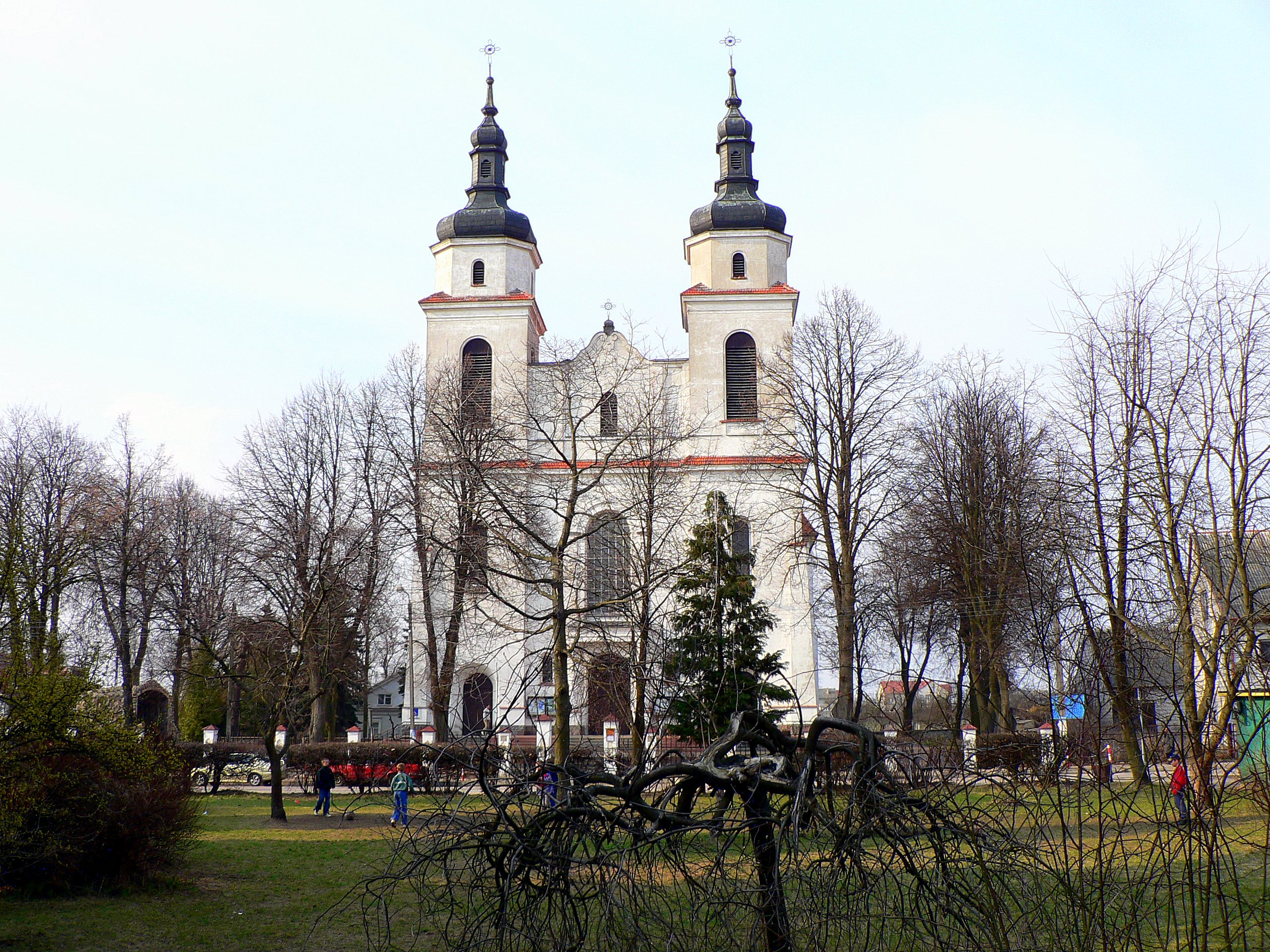
- Saint Jacob Church

- Coat of arms

- Location within Poland
- Coordinates: 53°17′12″N 22°18′08″E
- Country: Poland
- Voivodeship: Podlaskie
- County: Łomża
- Gmina: Jedwabne
- First mentioned: 1455
- Town rights: 1736

Area
  - Total: 11.47 km^{2} (4.43 sq mi)

Population (2006)
  - Total: 1,901
  - Density: 165.7/km^{2} (429.3/sq mi)
- Time zone: UTC+1 (CET)
  - Summer (DST): UTC+2 (CEST)
- Postal code: 18-420
- Vehicle registration: BLM
- Website: http://www.jedwabne.pl/

Jedwabne (pronounced [jed'vabne]; Yiddish: יעדוואבנע, Yedvabna) is a town in northeastern Poland, in Łomża County of Podlaskie Voivodeship, with 1,942 inhabitants (2002).

== History ==
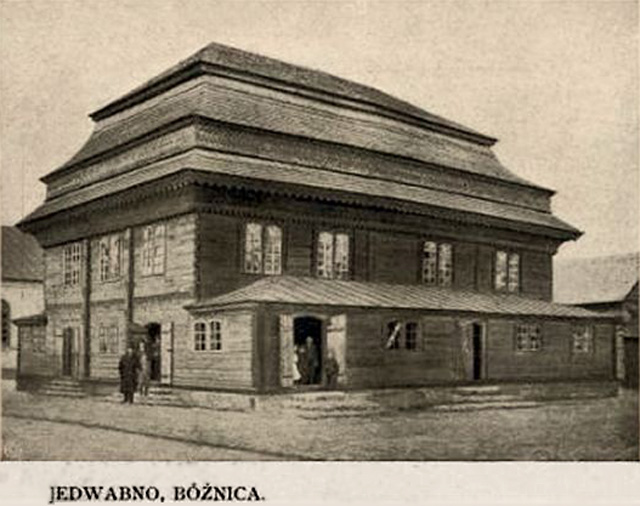
Jedwabne synagogue destroyed in a 1913 accidental fire

First mentioned in 1455 records, on 17 July 1736 Jedwabne received town rights from King Augustus III of Poland, including the privilege of holding weekly Sunday markets and five country fairs a year. A wooden Catholic church with two steeples was built in 1737–1738, and a synagogue around 1770. The Jedwabne synagogue was a fine example of the unique Polish Jewish architectural tradition of wooden synagogues.

In the Third Partition of Poland in 1795, it was annexed by Kingdom of Prussia. In 1807, it was regained by Poles and included within the short-lived Duchy of Warsaw, and after the duchy's dissolution in 1815, it became part of Russian-controlled Congress Poland.

At the end of the 18th century, new textile factories opened. In 1851 there were as many as 17 weaving establishments employing 36 workers in the town. In terms of its cloth production, Jedwabne was already the eleventh-largest manufacturing centre in Congress Poland. By 1862, 11 mechanical and 13 manual weaving machines had been installed at Jedwabne. The town's cloth production fell into decline only after the January Uprising of 1863, due to Russian repression against Polish and Jewish entrepreneurs. The town was the center of a large Jewish community with a population in 1900 of 1,941.

Following World War I, Poland regained independence and control of the town.

In the early 20th century, many Jedwabne residents had emigrated to the United States. Landing and settling in New York City, they built the synagogue Congregation Anshe Yedwabne at 242 Henry Street on the Lower East Side.

=== World War II ===
In September 1939 following the Invasion of Poland at the start of World War II, Jedwabne was briefly occupied by German troops who deported some 300 men to forced labor camps prior to transferring the area to the Soviets.

==== Soviet occupation ====
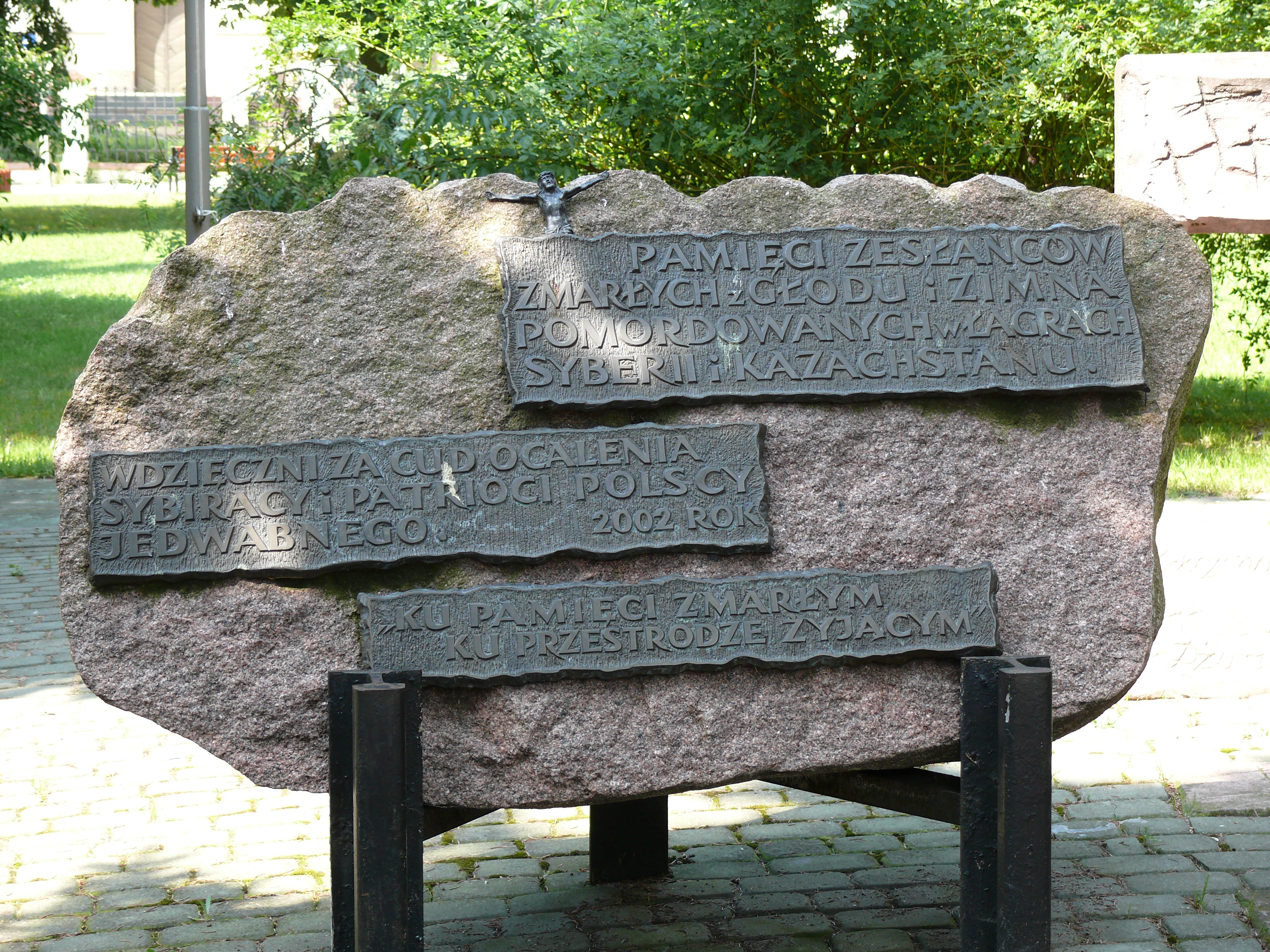
Memorial to victims of deportations to Soviet Gulag camps in Syberia and Kazakhstan

Following the Soviet invasion of eastern Poland in fulfillment of the Molotov–Ribbentrop Pact, between 1939 and 1941 the Soviet NKVD conducted anti-Polish repression. It was preceded by a successful Soviet attack against a Polish partisan unit stationed in the Kobielne Wilderness. In 1940 the town had 3,985 residents: 3,670 Poles, 250 Jews, and 65 Belarusians. The NKVD arrested a number of residents and their families and deported them to Siberia. Several Poles who were either born or lived and worked in Jedwabne were murdered by the Russians in the Katyn massacre in 1940.

==== German occupation ====
On 23 June 1941, as part of Operation Barbarossa, German troops reoccupied Jedwabne. Jewish refugees from Wizna and Radziłów, where on 7 July Jews were burned alive in a barn, took refuge in Jedwabne.

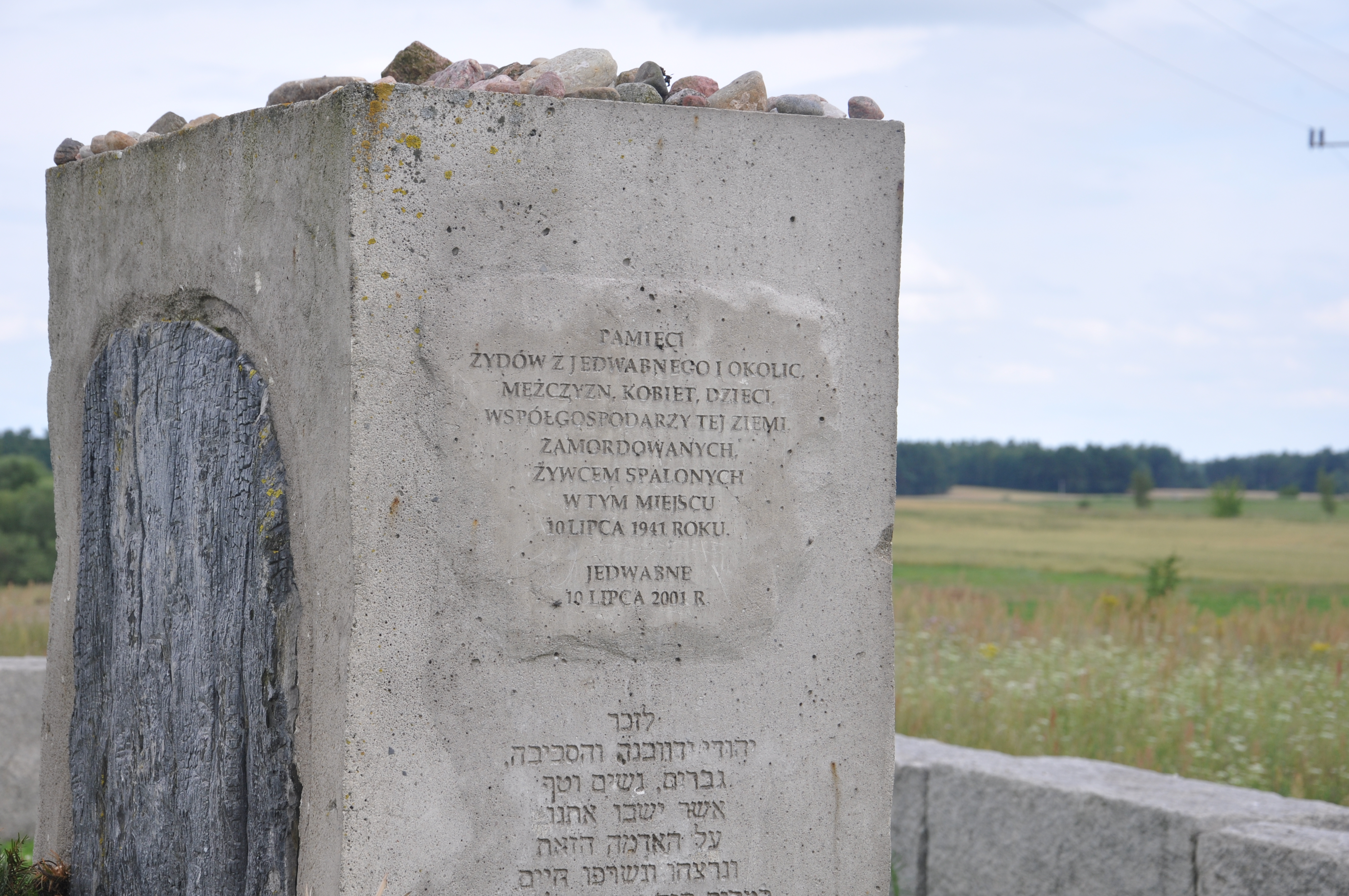
Memorial in Jedwabne

On 10 July 1941, the town's Jews were forced to assemble in the town square; there is a general consensus that the violence was performed by Polish men supported by German troops. A group of perpetrators humiliated and killed some of the assembled Jews. Some 50 to 70 Jews were forced to tear down the Soviet-built statue of Lenin and place the pieces in a Polish farmer's barn, after which they were beaten to death. The perpetrators men then marched the rest of the Jews into the barn and set it alight. Casualty estimates vary; a forensic investigation in 2002 set the number at 340 dead, while other estimates range as high as 2,000. Accounts differ as well as to the number of survivors of the massacre (between 125 and 302). Some 12 of the Polish perpetrators were convicted in 1949, receiving prison sentences of eight to fifteen years. However, it needs to be remembered that sentence was issued by occupational Soviet jurisdiction, who was keen into increasing Polish-Jewish tensions. Even more, because of the situation, there might not be a chance for a fair-trial.

Following the massacre, some of the surviving Jews were interned in the Jedwabne ghetto; one to three months later, the ghetto was dissolved and the inmates expelled to the Łomża Ghetto. From there, on 2 November 1942, they were transferred to the Zambrów transit camp; and from there, in January 1943, to the Auschwitz extermination camp. Some Jedwabne Jews managed to flee the ghetto liquidations, and some of them survived the war.

=== Recent period ===
In 1944, the German occupation ended and the town was restored to Poland, although with a Soviet-installed communist regime, which stayed in power until the Fall of Communism in the 1980s. In the following years, the Polish anti-communist resistance was active in the town and its environs. On 23 October 1945, the resistance clashed with the communist forces, liberating six arrested people. In 1945–1947, the resistance carried out five raids on local communist police station. On 29 September 1948, the resistance took control of the town. Also a local youth resistance organization Jutrzenka was founded and based in Jedwabne.

== Economy ==
Jedwabne is the administrative and economic centre for the surrounding gmina, which has an agricultural character. It offers educational and healthcare services for the community, as well as administrative support, business infrastructure, and investment financing. The town is flanked by the Biebrza National Park, the biggest complex of natural marshes in Central Europe; it is inhabited by moose as well as other animals and bird species, attracting numerous tourists. The Biebrza river nearby is surrounded by campgrounds for fishing, hiking, and mountain biking. Agrotourism substantially contributes to the local economy, with prolonged tourist season beginning on March 1 and lasting until October 30 each year.

== Notable people ==
- Anna Bikont (2001)
- Tomasz Strzembosz (2004)
- Jerzy Robert Nowak (2006)
