= Łomża County =

Łomża County Powiat łomżyński
- County
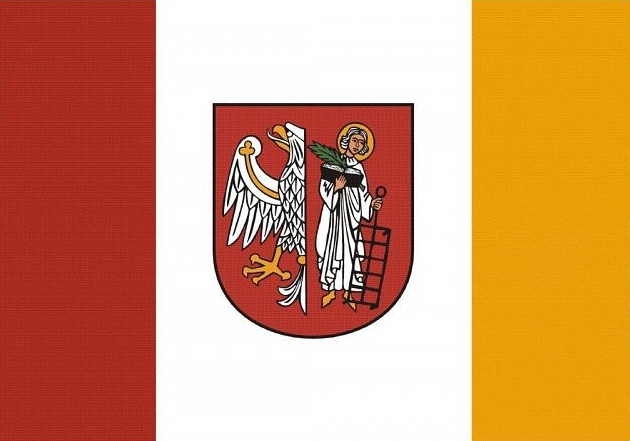
- Flag Coat of arms

- Location within the voivodeship

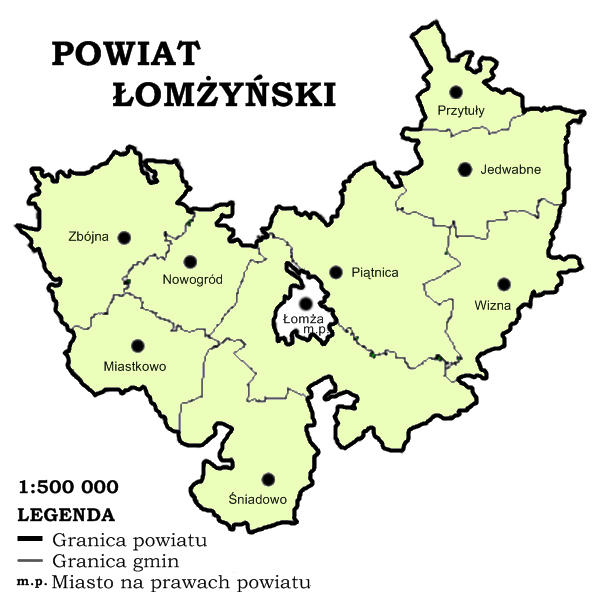
- Division into gminas
- Coordinates (Łomża): 53°10′N 22°5′E
- Country: Poland
- Voivodeship: Podlaskie
- Seat: Łomża
- Gminas: Total 9: Gmina Jedwabne; Gmina Łomża; Gmina Miastkowo; Gmina Nowogród; Gmina Piątnica; Gmina Przytuły; Gmina Śniadowo; Gmina Wizna; Gmina Zbójna

Area
  - Total: 1,353.93 km^{2} (522.76 sq mi)

Population (2019)
  - Total: 50,914
  - Density: 37.605/km^{2} (97.395/sq mi)
  - Urban: 3,781
  - Rural: 47,133
- Car plates: BLM
- Website: www.powiatlomzynski.pl

Łomża County (Polish: powiat łomżyński) is a unit of territorial administration and local government (powiat) in Podlaskie Voivodeship, north-eastern Poland. It came into being on January 1, 1999, as a result of the Polish local government reforms passed in 1998. Its administrative seat is the city of Łomża, although the city is not part of the county (it constitutes a separate city county). The only towns in Łomża County are Nowogród, which lies 16 km (10 mi) north-west of Łomża, and Jedwabne, 20 km (12 mi) north-east of Łomża.

The county covers an area of 1,353.93 square kilometres (522.8 sq mi). As of 2019 its total population is 50,914, out of which the population of Nowogród is 2,155, that of Jedwabne is 1,626, and the rural population is 47,133.

== Neighbouring counties ==
Apart from the city of Łomża, Łomża County is also bordered by Kolno County and Grajewo County to the north, Mońki County and Białystok County to the east, Zambrów County and Ostrów County to the south, and Ostrołęka County to the west.

== Administrative divisions ==
The county is subdivided into nine gminas (two urban-rural and seven rural). These are listed in the following table, in descending order of population.

Gmina	Type	Area (km^{2})	Population (2019)	Seat
Gmina Łomża	rural	207.4	11,099	Łomża *
Gmina Piątnica	rural	218.7	10,648	Piątnica
Gmina Śniadowo	rural	162.6	5,350	Śniadowo
Gmina Jedwabne	urban-rural	159.4	5,299	Jedwabne
Gmina Miastkowo	rural	114.8	4,225	Miastkowo
Gmina Zbójna	rural	185.8	4,189	Zbójna
Gmina Nowogród	urban-rural	101.0	4,013	Nowogród
Gmina Wizna	rural	133.1	4,008	Wizna
Gmina Przytuły	rural	71.2	2,083	Przytuły
* seat not part of the gmina
