= Puchały =

Puchały may refer to the following places:

- Puchały, Ostrołęka County in Masovian Voivodeship (east-central Poland)
- Puchały, Pruszków County in Masovian Voivodeship (east-central Poland)
- Puchały, Podlaskie Voivodeship (north-east Poland)
