= Chojny =

Chojny may refer to the following places:

- Chojny, Greater Poland Voivodeship (central Poland)
- Chojny, Kuyavian-Pomeranian Voivodeship (central Poland)
- Chojny, Łódź Voivodeship (central Poland)
- Chojny Młode, Podlaskie Voivodeship (north-eastern Poland)
- Stare Chojny, Podlaskie Voivodeship (north-eastern Poland)
