= Jaworki =

Jaworki may refer to the following villages in Poland:

- Jaworki, Lesser Poland Voivodeship (southern Poland)
- Jaworki, Podlaskie Voivodeship (north-east Poland)

Jaworki may refer to the following foods:

- Angel Wings, a Polish pastry
