= Łomża Ghetto =

Nazi ghetto in occupied Poland

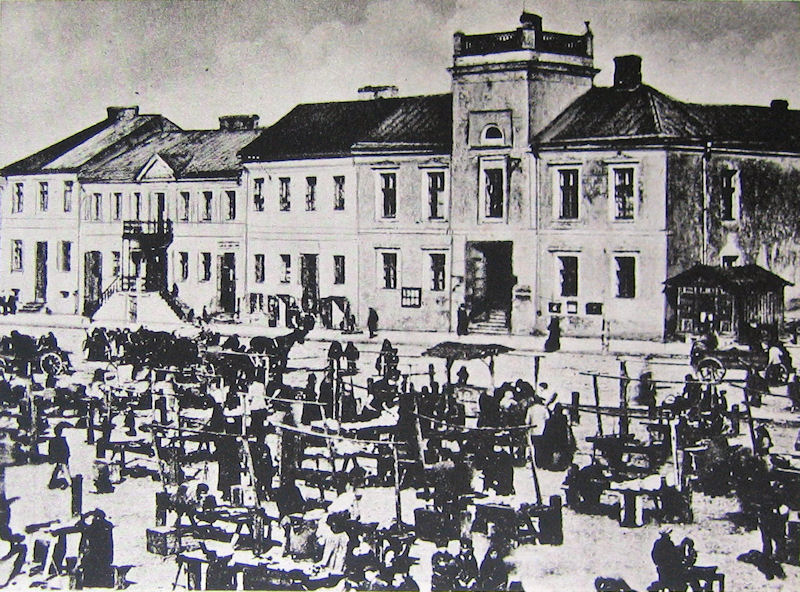
- The market square in Łomża before the two world wars

- Łomża location in the Holocaust in Poland
- Also known as: German: Ghetto Lomza
- Location: Łomża, German-occupied Poland
- Incident type: Imprisonment, slave labor, starvation, deportations to extermination camps
- Organizations: SS
- Camp: deportations to Auschwitz-Birkenau
- Victims: 10,000 to 18,000 Polish Jews

The Łomża Ghetto was a Nazi ghetto created by on 12 August 1941 in Łomża, Poland; for the purpose of persecution of Polish Jews. Two months after Operation Barbarossa, the invasion of the Soviet Union, the Jews were ordered to move there in a single day, resulting in panic at the main entry on Senatorska Street adjacent to the Old Market (Stary Rynek). The number of Jewish men, women, and children forced into the ghetto ranged from 10,000 to 18,000. The survivors of anti-Jewish pogroms, murders, and expulsions in Jedwabne, Stawiski, Wizna, and Rutki-Kossaki, as well as refugees from other locales, were interned in the ghetto. Often, six families were housed there in a single room. The Ghetto was liquidated a year-and-a-half later on 1 November 1942, when all prisoners were transported aboard Holocaust trains to Auschwitz-Birkenau for extermination.

== Ghetto history ==
In July 1941, Łomża Jews were ordered by the Germans to form a Judenrat. A Jewish Ghetto Police was established with Solomon Herbert named as its chief. All Jewish inhabitants were ordered to move into the new Ghetto in one day, on 12 August 1941. German and Polish auxiliary police inspected Jews entering the ghetto and forcibly confiscated valuables.

On 16 August, the inmates were assembled at the Green Market to be tallied. The Chairman of Judenrat was handed a list of about two hundred people accused of collaboration with the Soviets from before Operation Barbarossa. They were taken to the Giełczyn forest and killed by a Nazi Einsatzgruppe under SS-Obersturmführer Hermann Schaper.

For the rest, work cards were distributed among those with a place of employment. In the following days, more Jews were being brought in from surrounding villages such as Piątnica, Jedwabne and Stawiski. The Judenrat requested permission to expand the Ghetto. The Germans agreed on the condition that Jews pay half a million Marks. On 17 September however, before the expansion, the inmates were again ordered to assemble at the Square. The Germans separated those who did not have a work card. Over two thousand men and women were trucked to the Giełczyn and Sławiec forests and exterminated. On that date, the Ghetto was surrounded by barbed-wire with only one exit, requiring a special permit from the Gestapo. The main gate was built with the inscription: "DANGER, DISEASE". Jews who worked outside the Ghetto used that gate twice daily.

Conditions in the ghetto were poor, and a prohibition against Jews bringing food into the ghetto was brutally enforced by the Polish auxiliary police. In one instance, the Polish auxiliaries beat to death three Jews smuggling food and their corpses were then strung to the ghetto gates by the Germans. Epidemics of dysentery and typhus broke out in the winter of 1941. All infected died. A communal kitchen was set up serving about a thousand meals a day. There were no Jewish schools. Factories for ammunition, soap, leather, boots, and grease were established; some of them on the initiative of the Judenrat. They made products for the Germans such as shoes, garments and furs.

On 1 November 1942, the Ghetto was surrounded by the German gendarmerie and the following morning evacuation was ordered. Most of the Jews, 8,000–10,000 were taken to a transit camp in Zambrów and then to the extermination camp in Auschwitz. The remaining ones, went to the Kiełbasin Sammellagger, south of Grodno, and to Wołkowysk camps as well as to Białystok. Only a few succeeded in escaping. They found refuge with the Catholic Polish families. Dr Hefner of Judenrat took his own life. The last inmates of the Łomża Ghetto stayed in the Zambrow barracks until 14 to 18 January 1943, when they were sent to Auschwitz-Birkenau.
