= Czaplice =

Czaplice may refer to the following places:

- Czaplice, Podlaskie Voivodeship (north-east Poland)
- Czaplice, Gryfice County in West Pomeranian Voivodeship (north-west Poland)
- Czaplice, Wałcz County in West Pomeranian Voivodeship (north-west Poland)
