= Kołomyja =

Kołomyja may refer to the following places:

- Kolomyia, Ukraine (called Kołomyja in Polish)
- Kołomyja, Podlaskie Voivodeship (north-east Poland)
