= Jarnuty =

Jarnuty may refer to the following places:

- Jarnuty, Masovian Voivodeship (east-central Poland)
- Jarnuty, Gmina Łomża in Podlaskie Voivodeship (north-east Poland)
- Jarnuty, Gmina Wizna in Podlaskie Voivodeship (north-east Poland)
