= Rubinow =

Rubinow is a surname. Notable people with the surname include:

- Barry Rubinow (born 1956), American film executive and editor
- I. M. Rubinow (1875–1936), Russian theorist on social insurance

== See also ==
- Rubinówka, a location in Poland
- Robinow
- Robinow syndrome, a genetic disorder
