= Stanisław Modzelewski =

Polish serial killer

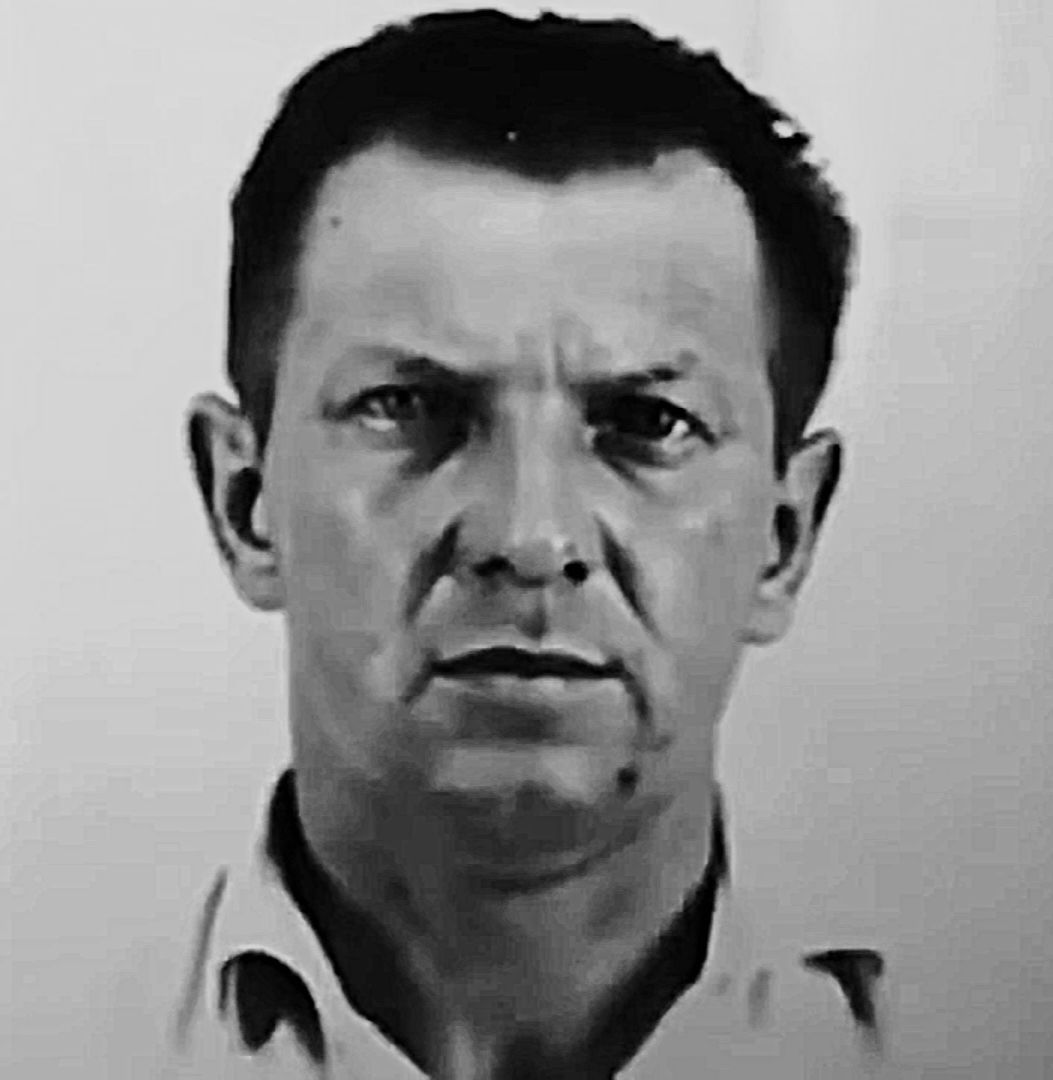
- Born: 15 March 1929; Szczepankowo, Poland
- Died: 13 November 1969 (aged 40); Mokotów Prison, Polish People's Republic
- Other name: The Vampire of Gałkówek
- Status: Executed by hanging
- Convictions: Murder (7 counts); Attempted murder (3 counts)
- Penalty: Death

Details
- Victims: 7–8
- Span of crimes: 1952–1967
- Country: Poland
- Date apprehended: 1967

Stanisław Modzelewski (15 March 1929 – 13 November 1969) was a Polish serial killer known as the Vampire of Gałkówek (Polish: Wampir z Gałkówka), active near Łódź, Poland during the 1950s. He completed three classes of primary school and worked in Warsaw as a driver. During 1952-1956 and in 1967, he murdered seven women and attempted to murder six others. Although he is believed to have murdered an eighth victim (which he confessed to), it was never proven as the body was never found. He was sentenced to death and the execution by hanging was carried out in November 1969, in Warsaw.

== Modus operandi ==
Modzelewski committed his first murder in 1952. He murdered women between the ages of 18 and 87 by strangling them with a scarf or with his bare hands. He took valuables as well as useless objects from his victims which he then threw away. He executed them with utmost cruelty. The murders also had a sexual motive. The lower part of the victims' bodies were nude and the arrangement of the corpse suggested a penetration of genital organs. Modzelewski was a sadist but it was not verified whether he tortured the victims before or after the murder.

== Victims ==
The list contains names of the confirmed victims of Modzelewski, the place of murder, the cause of death, and the approximate date of murder

1. Józefa Pietrzykowska (67) a forest in Zielona Góra near Gałkówek, strangled with bare hands, July 1952
2. Maria Kunka (32) a forest near Tuszyn, strangled with a scarf, December 1952
3. Teresa Piekarska (21) a field by the forest in Nowy Józefów, strangled with a scarf, March 1953
4. Irena Bernadetta Dunajska (24) a field near the road in Gałkówek, strangled with a scarf, January 1955
5. Helena Walos (18) the vicinity of a country road near the forest in Gałkówek, strangled with a scarf, March 1956
6. Helena Klata (22) the vicinity of a road near the rail track between Andrzejów and Gałkówek, strangled with a scarf or bandanna (a fragment of material was left on the victim's neck), August 1956
7. Maria Gałecka (87) a flat on Sienna Street in Warsaw, strangled or drowned (the corpse stuck out of the bathtub, the buttocks were exposed and cut with a sharp tool), 14 September 1967

== Investigation ==
The investigation of the Vampire of Gałkówek's murders was discontinued in 1957. Despite the thoroughness of the investigation, the perpetrator was not found as the police were led astray from the beginning. They assumed that the murderer was a Polish State Railways employee as the crimes were committed near the railway track and some of the women who managed to survive stated that the offender was wearing a uniform. As a result, the perpetrator was not found and the local people continued to live in fear.

In 1967, the case was reopened when Maria Gałecka was found dead. On 24 September 1967, Stanisław Modzelewski, her ex-neighbor whom was known to have had a number of disputes with the victim, was arrested. Modzelewski was executed by hanging on 13 November 1969.

== See also ==
- Capital punishment in Poland
- List of serial killers by country
