= Boguszyce, Podlaskie Voivodeship =

Boguszyce
- Village
- Location within Poland
- Coordinates: 53°7′13″N 22°0′45″E
- Country: Poland
- Voivodeship: Podlaskie
- County: Łomża
- Gmina: Łomża
- Population: 220

Boguszyce [bɔɡuˈʂɨt͡sɛ] is a village in the administrative district of Gmina Łomża, within Łomża County, Podlaskie Voivodeship, in north-eastern Poland.

== History ==
The earliest records of the village date back to 1388. During this time, Duke Janusz I the Old, affirming the grants made by his brother, Duke Siemowit IV, bestowed the lands upon knights Adam, Dobiesław, and Świętosław - brothers and heirs of Ulatowo.

Located in the second half of the 16th century within the Łomża County, the village was recognized as a noble estate. Between 1921 and 1939, the village fell within the Białystok Voivodeship, in the Łomża County, and was part of the Szczepankowo commune.

According to the 1921 National Census, the village had a population of 334 people residing in 36 residential buildings. The village was part of the Roman Catholic parish in Szczepankowo. Jurisdictionally, it was under the Magistrate's and District Court in Łomża; the designated post office was in Łomża.

Following the Soviet aggression against Poland in September 1939, the village came under Soviet occupation. From June 1941, it was occupied by Germany. From July 22, 1941, until 1945, it was incorporated into Landkreis Lomscha, Bezirk Bialystok of the Third Reich.

From 1975 to 1998, the village was administratively part of the Łomża County.

== Manor and Farm Complex ==
Currently not preserved, only part of the inner wall of the neoclassical manor remains. It is not open for tours as it stands on private property. The farm complex with the manor was shaped like an elongated rectangle oriented east–west.

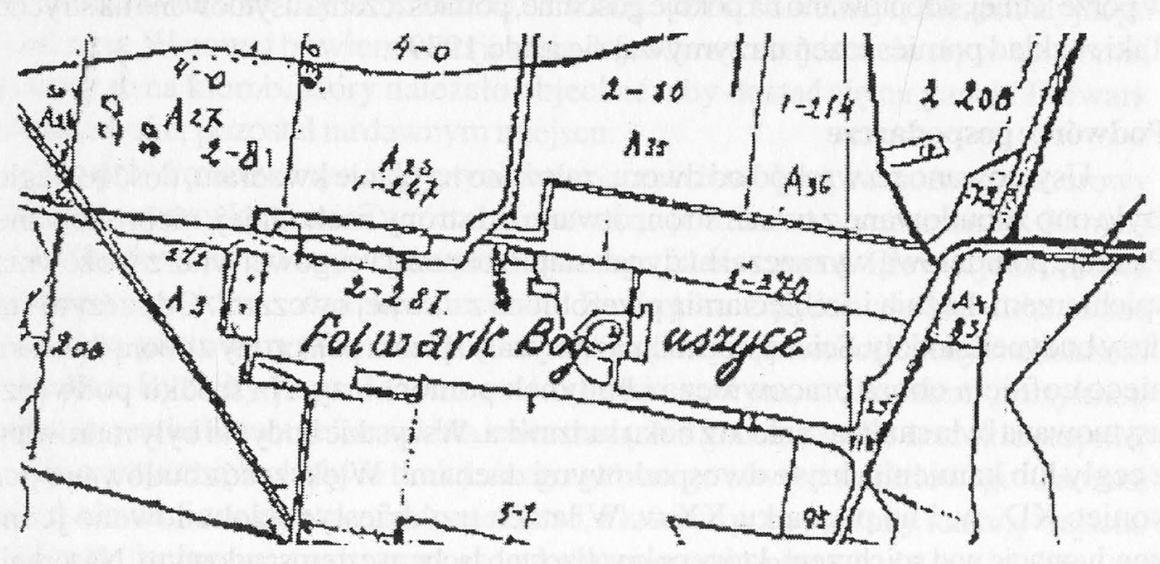
Plan of the estate from 1878
