= Bacze-Lipnik =

- Settlement
- Location within Poland
- Coordinates: 53°03′33″N 22°08′05″E
- Country: Poland
- Voivodeship: Podlaskie
- County: Łomża
- Gmina: Łomża

Bacze-Lipnik (Polish pronunciation: [ˈbat͡ʂɛ ˈlipɲik]) is a settlement in the administrative district of Gmina Łomża, within Łomża County, Podlaskie Voivodeship, in north-eastern Poland.
