= Gmina Rutki =

Gmina Rutki Rutki Commune
- Gmina
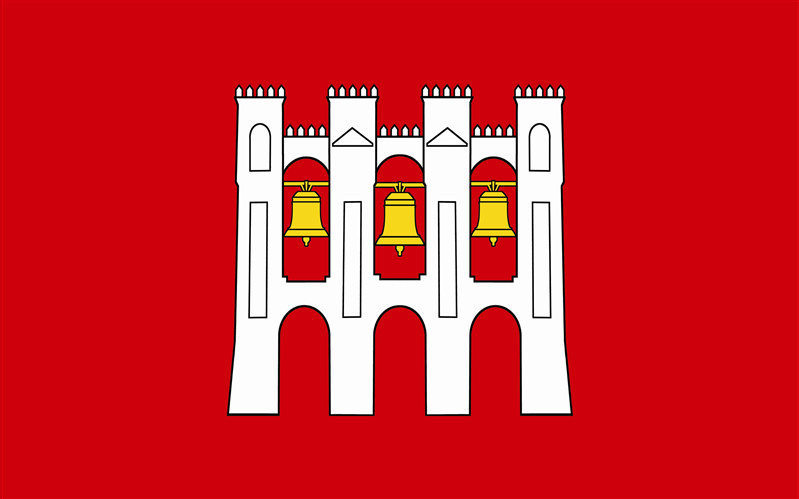
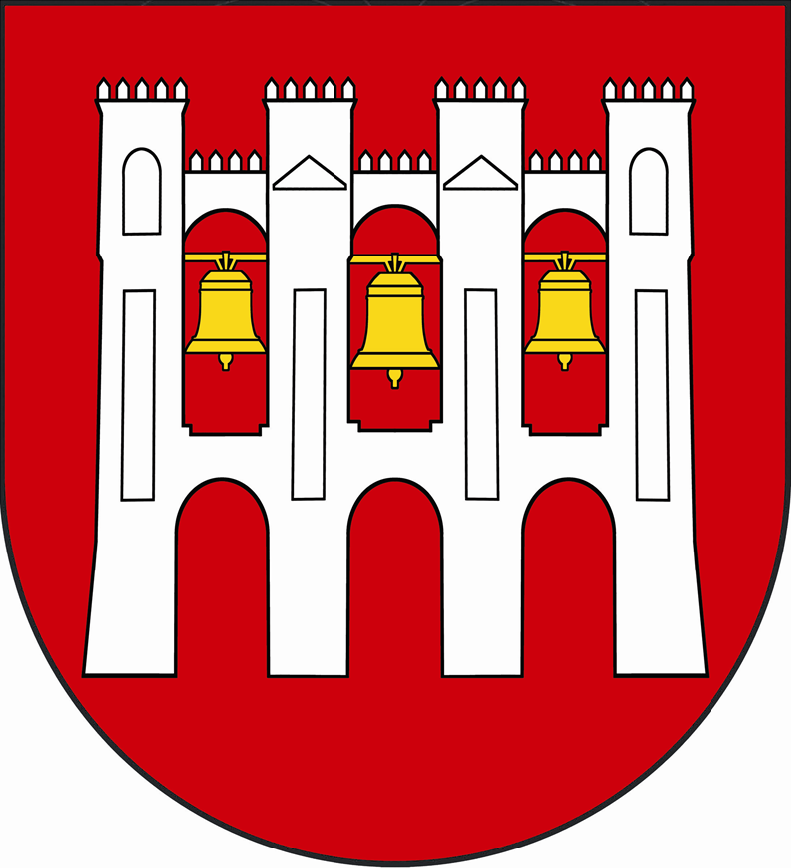
- Flag Coat of arms

- Location within Poland
- Coordinates (Rutki-Kossaki): 53°5′N 22°26′E
- Country: Poland
- Voivodeship: Podlaskie
- County: Zambrów
- Seat: Rutki-Kossaki

Area
  - Total: 200.2 km^{2} (77.3 sq mi)

Population (2013)
  - Total: 5,801
  - Density: 28.98/km^{2} (75.05/sq mi)
- Website: http://www.gminarutki.pl/

Gmina Rutki is a rural gmina (administrative district) in Zambrów County, Podlaskie Voivodeship, in north-eastern Poland. Its seat is the village of Rutki-Kossaki, which lies approximately 17 kilometres (11 mi) north-east of Zambrów and 50 km (31 mi) west of the regional capital Białystok.

The gmina covers an area of 200.2 square kilometres (77.3 sq mi), and as of 2006 its total population is 6,072 (5,801 in 2013).

The gmina contains part of the protected area called Łomża Landscape Park.

== Villages ==
Gmina Rutki contains the villages and settlements of:

- Czochanie-Góra
- Dębniki
- Dobrochy
- Duchny-Wieluny
- Górskie Ponikły-Stok
- Grądy-Woniecko
- Gronostaje-Puszcza
- Jaworki
- Jawory-Klepacze
- Kałęczyn-Walochy
- Kalinówka-Basie
- Kalinówka-Bystry
- Kalinówka-Wielobory
- Kołomyja
- Kołomyjka
- Konopki Leśne
- Kossaki Nadbielne
- Kossaki-Falki
- Kossaki-Ostatki
- Mężenin
- Mieczki
- Modzele-Górki
- Nowe Zalesie
- Nowe Zambrzyce
- Olszewo-Przyborowo
- Ożarki-Olszanka
- Ożary Wielkie
- Pęsy-Lipno
- Pruszki Wielkie
- Rutki-Jatki
- Rutki-Kossaki
- Rutki-Nowiny
- Rutki-Tartak Nowy
- Śliwowo-Łopienite
- Stare Zalesie
- Stare Zambrzyce
- Świątki-Wiercice
- Szlasy-Lipno
- Szlasy-Łopienite
- Szlasy-Mieszki
- Walochy-Mońki
- Wybrany
- Zambrzyce-Jankowo
- Zambrzyce-Kapusty
- Zambrzyce-Króle
- Zambrzyce-Plewki

== Neighbouring gminas ==
Gmina Rutki is bordered by the gminas of Kobylin-Borzymy, Kołaki Kościelne, Kulesze Kościelne, Łomża, Wizna, Zambrów and Zawady.
