= Modzele-Skudosze =

- Village
- Location within Poland
- Coordinates: 53°3′20″N 22°10′32″E
- Country: Poland
- Voivodeship: Podlaskie
- County: Łomża
- Gmina: Łomża

Modzele-Skudosze [mɔˈd͡zɛlɛ skuˈdɔʂɛ] is a village in the administrative district of Gmina Łomża, within Łomża County, Podlaskie Voivodeship, in north-eastern Poland.

== See also ==
- Poland
