= Bacze Suche =

- Village
- Location within Poland
- Coordinates: 53°4′3″N 22°6′49″E
- Country: Poland
- Voivodeship: Podlaskie
- County: Łomża
- Gmina: Łomża

Bacze Suche [ˈbat͡ʂɛ ˈsuxɛ] is a village in the administrative district of Gmina Łomża, within Łomża County, Podlaskie Voivodeship, in north-eastern Poland.
