= Koty, Podlaskie Voivodeship =

Koty
- Village
- Location within Poland
- Coordinates: 53°5′23″N 22°16′56″E
- Country: Poland
- Voivodeship: Podlaskie
- County: Łomża
- Gmina: Łomża

Koty [ˈkɔtɨ] is a village in the administrative district of Gmina Łomża, within Łomża County, Podlaskie Voivodeship, in north-eastern Poland.
