= Nowe Kupiski =

- Village
- Location within Poland
- Coordinates: 53°11′N 21°58′E
- Country: Poland
- Voivodeship: Podlaskie
- County: Łomża
- Gmina: Łomża

Nowe Kupiski [ˈnɔvɛ kuˈpiski] is a village in the administrative district of Gmina Łomża, within Łomża County, Podlaskie Voivodeship, in north-eastern Poland.
