= Podgórze, Podlaskie Voivodeship =

Podgórze
- Village
- Location within Poland
- Coordinates: 53°6′N 22°7′E
- Country: Poland
- Voivodeship: Podlaskie
- County: Łomża
- Gmina: Łomża
- Postal code: 18-400
- Vehicle registration: BLM

Podgórze [pɔdˈɡuʐɛ] is a village in the administrative district of Gmina Łomża, within Łomża County, Podlaskie Voivodeship, in north-eastern Poland.

Four Polish citizens were murdered by Nazi Germany in the village during World War II.
