= Świątki-Wiercice =

- Village
- Location within Poland
- Coordinates: 53°04′02″N 22°32′42″E
- Country: Poland
- Voivodeship: Podlaskie
- County: Zambrów
- Gmina: Rutki

Świątki-Wiercice (Polish pronunciation: [ˈɕfjɔntkʲi vjɛrˈt͡ɕit͡sɛ]) is a village in the administrative district of Gmina Rutki, within Zambrów County, Podlaskie Voivodeship, in north-eastern Poland.
