= Bożenica =

- Village
- Location within Poland
- Coordinates: 53°12′N 21°59′E
- Country: Poland
- Voivodeship: Podlaskie
- County: Łomża
- Gmina: Łomża

Bożenica [bɔʐɛˈnit͡sa] is a village in the administrative district of Gmina Łomża, within Łomża County, Podlaskie Voivodeship, in north-eastern Poland.
