= Pniewo, Podlaskie Voivodeship =

Pniewo
- Village
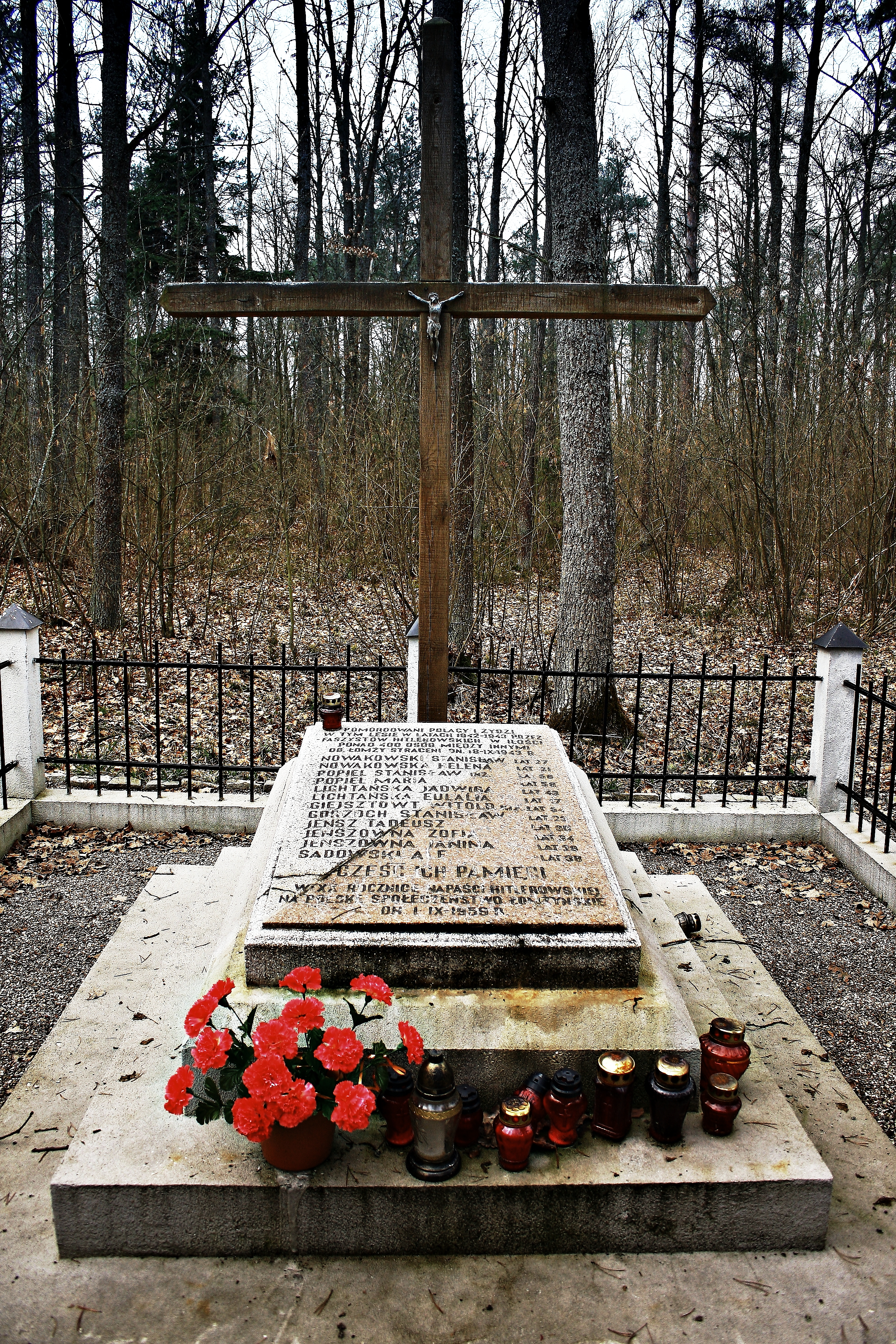
- Memorial at the site of German massacres of around 400 Poles and Jews in Pniewo

- Location within Poland
- Coordinates: 53°6′12″N 22°12′7″E
- Country: Poland
- Voivodeship: Podlaskie
- County: Łomża
- Gmina: Łomża
- Population: 750
- Time zone: UTC+1 (CET)
  - Summer (DST): UTC+2 (CEST)
- Vehicle registration: BLM

Pniewo [ˈpɲɛvɔ] is a village in the administrative district of Gmina Łomża, within Łomża County, Podlaskie Voivodeship, in north-eastern Poland.

== History ==
After the joint German-Soviet invasion of Poland, which started World War II, the village was occupied by the Soviet Union from 1939 to 1941, and then by Nazi Germany from 1941 to 1944. In 1942–1943, the Germans massacred around 400 Poles and Jews in the Pniewo forest. There is a memorial at the site.

== People born in Pniewo ==
- Teodor Szybiłło (1873-1937?), Polish politician and member of the Legislative Sejm (1919-1922).
