= Kossaki-Falki =

- Village
- Location within Poland
- Coordinates: 53°6′22″N 22°22′9″E
- Country: Poland
- Voivodeship: Podlaskie
- County: Zambrów
- Gmina: Rutki
- Population: 80

Kossaki-Falki [kɔsˈsaki ˈfalki] is a village in the administrative district of Gmina Rutki, within Zambrów County, Podlaskie Voivodeship, in north-eastern Poland.
