= Kossaki-Ostatki =

- Village
- Location within Poland
- Coordinates: 53°5′42″N 22°21′7″E
- Country: Poland
- Voivodeship: Podlaskie
- County: Zambrów
- Gmina: Rutki

Kossaki-Ostatki [kɔsˈsaki ɔsˈtatki] is a village in the administrative district of Gmina Rutki, within Zambrów County, Podlaskie Voivodeship, in north-eastern Poland.
