= Pęsy-Lipno, Gmina Rutki =

Pęsy-Lipno
- Village
- Location within Poland
- Coordinates: 53°04′12″N 22°16′11″E
- Country: Poland
- Voivodeship: Podlaskie
- County: Zambrów
- Gmina: Rutki

Pęsy-Lipno [ˈpɛ̃sɨ ˈlipnɔ] is a village in the administrative district of Gmina Rutki, within Zambrów County, Podlaskie Voivodeship, in north-eastern Poland.
