= Rutki-Tartak Nowy =

- Village
- Location within Poland
- Coordinates: 53°6′N 22°42′E
- Country: Poland
- Voivodeship: Podlaskie
- County: Zambrów
- Gmina: Rutki

Rutki-Tartak Nowy [ˈrutki ˈtartak ˈnɔvɨ] is a village in the administrative district of Gmina Rutki, within Zambrów County, Podlaskie Voivodeship, in north-eastern Poland.
