= Dębniki, Zambrów County =

Dębniki
- Village
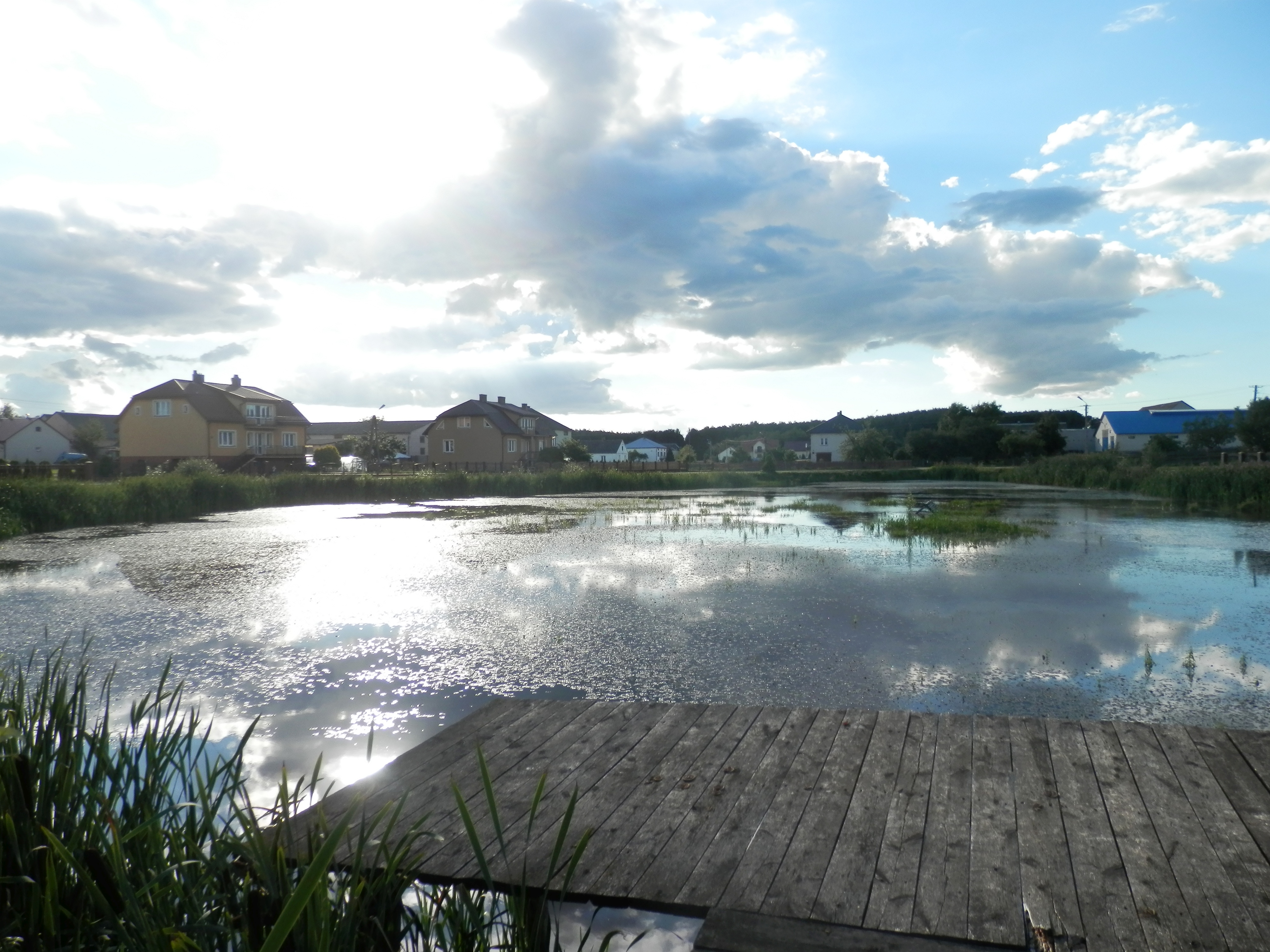

- Location within Poland
- Coordinates: 53°03′32″N 22°27′30″E
- Country: Poland
- Voivodeship: Podlaskie
- County: Zambrów
- Gmina: Rutki

Dębniki [dɛmbˈniki] is a village in the administrative district of Gmina Rutki, within Zambrów County, Podlaskie Voivodeship, in north-eastern Poland.
