= Walochy-Mońki =

- Village
- Location within Poland
- Coordinates: 53°8′N 22°40′E
- Country: Poland
- Voivodeship: Podlaskie
- County: Zambrów
- Gmina: Rutki

Walochy-Mońki [vaˈlɔxɨ ˈmɔɲki] is a village in the administrative district of Gmina Rutki, within Zambrów County, Podlaskie Voivodeship, in north-eastern Poland.
