= Gmina Łomża =

Gmina Łomża Łomża Commune
- Gmina
- Flag Coat of arms

- Gmina Łomża within the Łomża County
- Coordinates (Łomża): 53°10′N 22°5′E
- Country: Poland
- Voivodeship: Podlaskie
- County: Łomża County
- Seat: Łomża

Area
  - Total: 207.41 km^{2} (80.08 sq mi)

Population (2011)
  - Total: 10,724
  - Density: 51.704/km^{2} (133.91/sq mi)
- Website: http://www.lomza.powiatlomzynski.pl/

Gmina Łomża is a rural gmina (administrative district) in Łomża County, Podlaskie Voivodeship, in north-eastern Poland. Its seat is the town of Łomża, although the town is not part of the territory of the gmina.

The gmina covers an area of 207.41 square kilometres (80.1 sq mi), and as of 2006 its total population is 9,920 (10,724 in 2011).

The gmina contains part of the protected area called Łomża Landscape Park.

== Villages ==
Gmina Łomża contains the villages and settlements of Andrzejki, Bacze Suche, Bacze-Lipnik, Boguszyce, Bożenica, Chojny Młode, Czaplice, Dłużniewo, Gać, Giełczyn, Grzymały Szczepankowskie, Janowo, Jarnuty, Jednaczewo, Kisiołki, Konarzyce, Koty, Łochtynowo, Lutostań, Mikołajew, Mikołajki, Milewo, Modzele-Skudosze, Modzele-Wypychy, Nowe Kupiski, Nowe Wyrzyki, Pniewo, Podgórze, Puchały, Rubinówka, Rybno, Siemień Nadrzeczny, Siemień-Rowy, Sierzputy Młode, Stara Łomża nad Rzeką, Stara Łomża przy Szosie, Stare Chojny, Stare Kupiski, Stare Modzele, Stare Sierzputy, Wygoda and Zawady.

== Neighbouring gminas ==
Gmina Łomża is bordered by the city of Łomża and by the gminas of Mały Płock, Miastkowo, Nowogród, Piątnica, Rutki, Śniadowo, Wizna and Zambrów.
