= Śliwowo-Łopienite =

- Village
- Location within Poland
- Coordinates: 53°04′23″N 22°30′50″E
- Country: Poland
- Voivodeship: Podlaskie
- County: Zambrów
- Gmina: Rutki

Śliwowo-Łopienite [ɕliˈvɔvɔ wɔpjɛˈnitɛ] is a village in the administrative district of Gmina Rutki, within Zambrów County, Podlaskie Voivodeship, in north-eastern Poland.
