= Modzele-Górki =

- Village
- Location within Poland
- Coordinates: 53°03′41″N 22°29′04″E
- Country: Poland
- Voivodeship: Podlaskie
- County: Zambrów
- Gmina: Rutki

Modzele-Górki [mɔˈd͡zɛlɛ ˈɡurki] is a village in the administrative district of Gmina Rutki, within Zambrów County, Podlaskie Voivodeship, in north-eastern Poland.
