= Stare Modzele =

- Village
- Location within Poland
- Coordinates: 53°4′17″N 22°9′32″E
- Country: Poland
- Voivodeship: Podlaskie
- County: Łomża
- Gmina: Łomża
- Postal code: 18-400
- Vehicle registration: BLM

Stare Modzele [ˈstarɛ mɔˈd͡zɛlɛ] is a village in the administrative district of Gmina Łomża, within Łomża County, Podlaskie Voivodeship, in north-eastern Poland.

Five Polish citizens were murdered by Nazi Germany in the village during World War II.
