= Kossaki Nadbielne =

- Village
- Location within Poland
- Coordinates: 53°06′03″N 22°20′33″E
- Country: Poland
- Voivodeship: Podlaskie
- County: Zambrów
- Gmina: Rutki

Kossaki Nadbielne [kɔsˈsaki nadˈbjɛlnɛ] is a village in the administrative district of Gmina Rutki, within Zambrów County, Podlaskie Voivodeship, in north-eastern Poland.
