= Gać, Podlaskie Voivodeship =

Gać
- Village
- Location within Poland
- Coordinates: 53°4′46″N 22°14′46″E
- Country: Poland
- Voivodeship: Podlaskie
- County: Łomża
- Gmina: Łomża
- Population: 986

Gać (Polish pronunciation: [ɡat͡ɕ]) is a village in the administrative district of Gmina Łomża, within Łomża County, Podlaskie Voivodeship, in north-eastern Poland.

In 2002 the village had a population of 986.
