= Górskie Ponikły-Stok =

- Village
- Location within Poland
- Coordinates: 53°5′N 22°29′E
- Country: Poland
- Voivodeship: Podlaskie
- County: Zambrów
- Gmina: Rutki

Górskie Ponikły-Stok [ˈɡurskʲɛ pɔˈnikwɨ ˈstɔk] is a village in the administrative district of Gmina Rutki, within Zambrów County, Podlaskie Voivodeship, in north-eastern Poland.
