= Andrzejki, Podlaskie Voivodeship =

Andrzejki
- Village
- Location within Poland
- Coordinates: 53°6′19″N 21°59′46″E
- Country: Poland
- Voivodeship: Podlaskie
- County: Łomża
- Gmina: Łomża
- Population: 100

Andrzejki [anˈdʐɛi̯ki] is a village in the administrative district of Gmina Łomża, within Łomża County, Podlaskie Voivodeship, in north-eastern Poland.
