= Zawady, Łomża County =

Zawady
- Village
- Location within Poland
- Coordinates: 53°8′N 22°4′E
- Country: Poland
- Voivodeship: Podlaskie
- County: Łomża
- Gmina: Łomża

Zawady [zaˈvadɨ] is a village in the administrative district of Gmina Łomża, within Łomża County, Podlaskie Voivodeship, in north-eastern Poland.
