= Kołomyjka =

- Village
- Location within Poland
- Coordinates: 53°5′N 22°23′E
- Country: Poland
- Voivodeship: Podlaskie
- County: Zambrów
- Gmina: Rutki

Kołomyjka [kɔwɔˈmɨi̯ka] is a village in the administrative district of Gmina Rutki, within Zambrów County, Podlaskie Voivodeship, in north-eastern Poland.
