= Ożary Wielkie =

- Village
- Location within Poland
- Coordinates: 53°7′12″N 22°29′29″E
- Country: Poland
- Voivodeship: Podlaskie
- County: Zambrów
- Gmina: Rutki

Ożary Wielkie [ɔˈʐarɨ ˈvjɛlkʲɛ] is a village in the administrative district of Gmina Rutki, within Zambrów County, Podlaskie Voivodeship, in north-eastern Poland.
