= Kalinówka-Bystry =

- Village
- Location within Poland
- Coordinates: 53°6′N 22°23′E
- Country: Poland
- Voivodeship: Podlaskie
- County: Zambrów
- Gmina: Rutki
- Population (approx.): 70

Kalinówka-Bystry [kaliˈnufka ˈbɨstrɨ] is a village in the administrative district of Gmina Rutki, within Zambrów County, Podlaskie Voivodeship, in north-eastern Poland.
