= Nowe Zalesie, Zambrów County =

Nowe Zalesie
- Village
- Location within Poland
- Coordinates: 53°06′25″N 22°30′43″E
- Country: Poland
- Voivodeship: Podlaskie
- County: Zambrów
- Gmina: Rutki

Nowe Zalesie [ˈnɔvɛ zaˈlɛɕɛ] is a village in the administrative district of Gmina Rutki, within Zambrów County, Podlaskie Voivodeship, in north-eastern Poland.
