= Siemień-Rowy =

Village in Gmina Łomża, Poland

- Village
- Location within Poland
- Coordinates: 53°07′59″N 22°09′39″E
- Country: Poland
- Voivodeship: Podlaskie
- County: Łomża
- Gmina: Łomża

Siemień-Rowy [ˈɕɛmjɛɲ ˈrɔvɨ] is a village in the administrative district of Gmina Łomża, within Łomża County, Podlaskie Voivodeship, in north-eastern Poland.
