= Grądy-Woniecko =

- Village
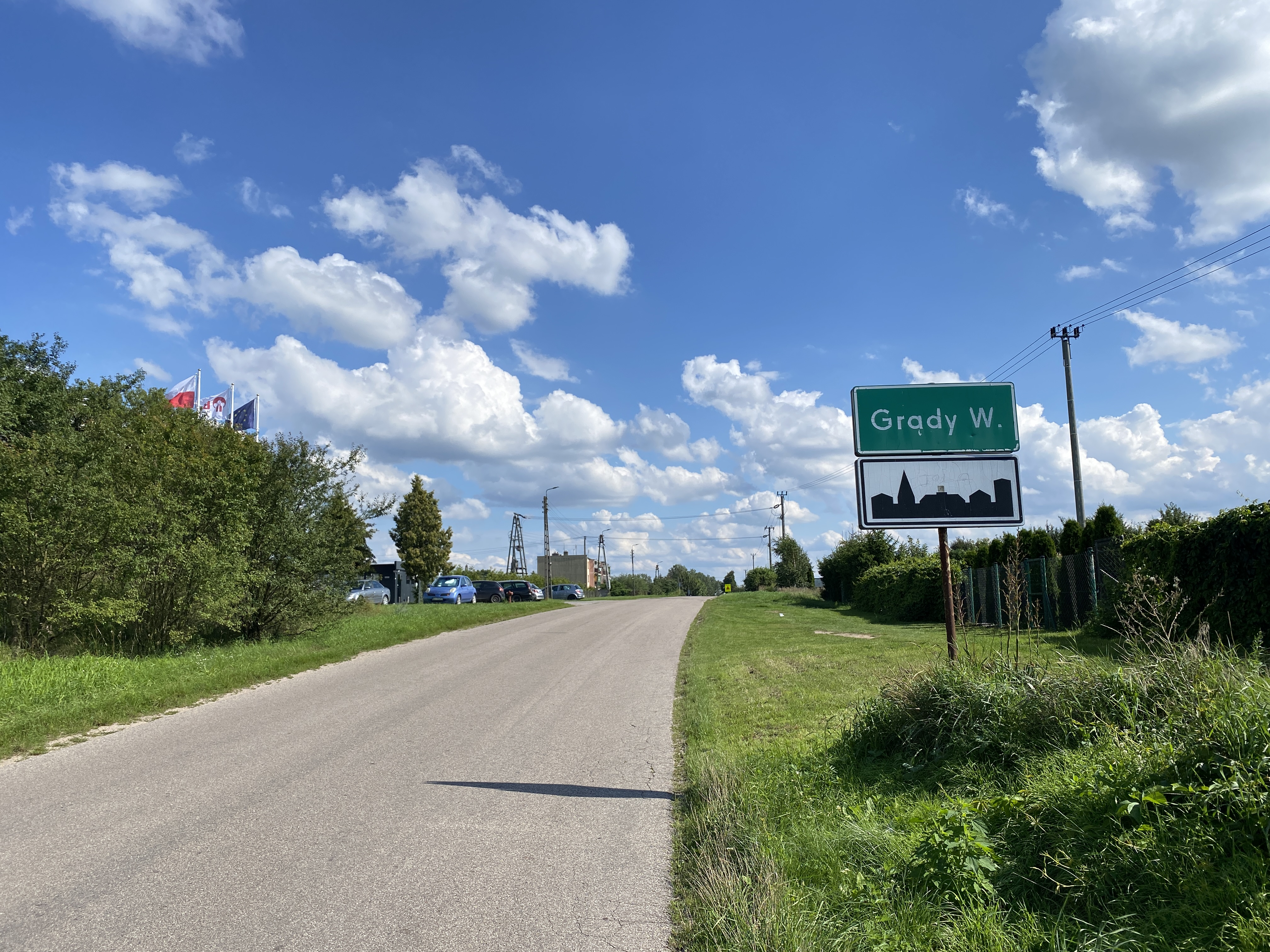
- Grądy-Woniecko (2025)

- Location within Poland
- Coordinates: 53°09′00″N 22°24′00″E
- Country: Poland
- Voivodeship: Podlaskie
- County: Zambrów
- Gmina: Rutki

Grądy-Woniecko [ˈɡrɔndɨ vɔˈɲɛt͡skɔ] is a village in the administrative district of Gmina Rutki, within Zambrów County, Podlaskie Voivodeship, in north-eastern Poland.
