= Rutki-Jatki =

- Village
- Location within Poland
- Coordinates: 53°03′21″N 22°25′53″E
- Country: Poland
- Voivodeship: Podlaskie
- County: Zambrów
- Gmina: Rutki

Rutki-Jatki [ˈrutki ˈjatki] is a village in the administrative district of Gmina Rutki, within Zambrów County, Podlaskie Voivodeship, in north-eastern Poland.
