= Zambrzyce-Jankowo =

- Village
- Location within Poland
- Coordinates: 53°05′59″N 22°35′16″E
- Country: Poland
- Voivodeship: Podlaskie
- County: Zambrów
- Gmina: Rutki

Zambrzyce-Jankowo [zamˈbʐɨt͡sɛ jaŋˈkɔvɔ] is a village in the administrative district of Gmina Rutki, within Zambrów County, Podlaskie Voivodeship, in north-eastern Poland.
