= Teodor Szybiłło =

Polish politician

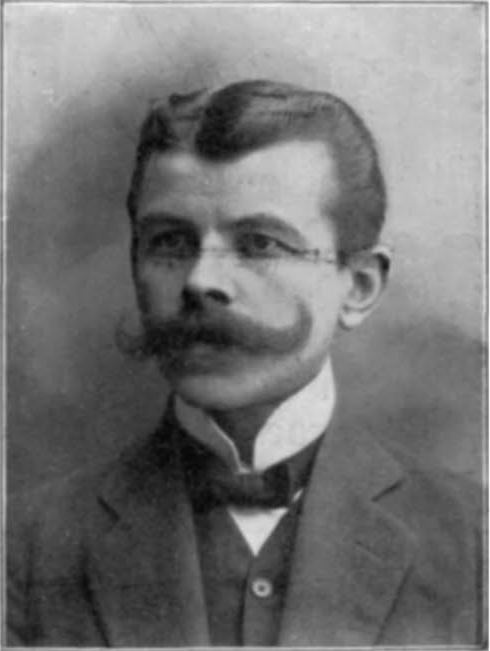
Teodor Szybiłło

Teodor Szybiłło (1873 in Pniewo - 24 July 1937 in Łódź) was a Polish politician and member of the Legislative Sejm (1919–1922).

He finished elementary school and two classes of gymnasium in Łomża, and later school for surgeons in Warsaw. Szybiłło than moved to Łódź, where he opened a hairdressing salon.

In 1905 he joined Narodowy Związek Robotniczy (National Union of Workers).

He was elected a member of the Lesiglative Sejm on 26 January 1919.

His fate after 1929 is unknown. He died in 1937.

== Bibliography ==
- Ryńca, Mariusz (2014). "Teodor Szybiłło". Polski Słownik Biograficzny. Vol. 49. Polska Akademia Nauk & Polska Akademia Umiejętności. pp. 515–516.
