= Jawory-Klepacze =

- Village
- Location within Poland
- Coordinates: 53°7′8″N 22°31′46″E
- Country: Poland
- Voivodeship: Podlaskie
- County: Zambrów
- Gmina: Rutki

Jawory-Klepacze [jaˈvɔrɨ klɛˈpat͡ʂɛ] is a village in the administrative district of Gmina Rutki, within Zambrów County, Podlaskie Voivodeship, in north-eastern Poland.
