= Dłużniewo, Podlaskie Voivodeship =

Dłużniewo
- Village
- Location within Poland
- Coordinates: 53°8′44″N 22°0′18″E
- Country: Poland
- Voivodeship: Podlaskie
- County: Łomża
- Gmina: Łomża

Dłużniewo [dwuʐˈɲɛvɔ] is a village in the administrative district of Gmina Łomża, within Łomża County, Podlaskie Voivodeship, in north-eastern Poland.
