= Rybno, Podlaskie Voivodeship =

Rybno
- Village
- Location within Poland
- Coordinates: 53°7′08″N 22°11′11″E
- Country: Poland
- Voivodeship: Podlaskie
- County: Łomża
- Gmina: Łomża

Rybno [ˈrɨbnɔ] is a village in the administrative district of Gmina Łomża, within Łomża County, Podlaskie Voivodeship, in north-eastern Poland.
