= Robinow =

Robinow is a surname. Notable people with this surname include:

- Carl Franz Robinow (1909–2006), German researcher
- Walter Robinow (1867–1938), German chess functionary and organiser

== See also ==
- Robinow syndrome, named after Meinhard Robinow
- Rubinow
