= Wybrany =

- Village
- Location within Poland
- Coordinates: 53°04′45″N 22°20′25″E
- Country: Poland
- Voivodeship: Podlaskie
- County: Zambrów
- Gmina: Rutki

Wybrany [vɨˈbranɨ] is a village in the administrative district of Gmina Rutki, within Zambrów County, Podlaskie Voivodeship, in northeastern Poland.
