= Kałęczyn-Walochy =

- Village
- Location within Poland
- Coordinates: 53°05′50″N 22°22′59″E
- Country: Poland
- Voivodeship: Podlaskie
- County: Zambrów
- Gmina: Rutki

Kałęczyn-Walochy [kaˈwɛnt͡ʂɨn vaˈlɔxɨ] is a village in the administrative district of Gmina Rutki, within Zambrów County, Podlaskie Voivodeship, in north-eastern Poland.
