= Mieczki, Zambrów County =

Mieczki
- Village
- Location within Poland
- Coordinates: 53°04′13″N 22°20′00″E
- Country: Poland
- Voivodeship: Podlaskie
- County: Zambrów
- Gmina: Rutki

Mieczki [ˈmjɛt͡ʂki] is a village in the administrative district of Gmina Rutki, within Zambrów County, Podlaskie Voivodeship, in north-eastern Poland.
