= Giełczyn, Łomża County =

Giełczyn
- Village
- Location within Poland
- Coordinates: 53°7′N 22°4′E
- Country: Poland
- Voivodeship: Podlaskie
- County: Łomża
- Gmina: Łomża

Giełczyn [ˈɡʲɛu̯t͡ʂɨn] is a village in the administrative district of Gmina Łomża, within Łomża County, Podlaskie Voivodeship, in north-eastern Poland.

The village is located at the north-eastern edge of a large forest complex known as the Red Wood (Czerwony Bór), a place of Polish and Jewish martyrology during World War II.

== Modern history ==
Between 1941 and 1944, during Nazi German occupation of Poland, German commandos carried out mass killings of Poles and the Polish Jews trucked in from the Łomża Ghetto among other places, executed into pits on the outskirts of the Giełczyn forest.
