= Modzele-Wypychy =

- Village
- Location within Poland
- Coordinates: 53°3′N 22°11′E
- Country: Poland
- Voivodeship: Podlaskie
- County: Łomża
- Gmina: Łomża

Modzele-Wypychy [mɔˈd͡zɛlɛ vɨˈpɨxɨ] is a village in the administrative district of Gmina Łomża, within Łomża County, Podlaskie Voivodeship, in north-eastern Poland.
