= Czochanie-Góra =

- Village
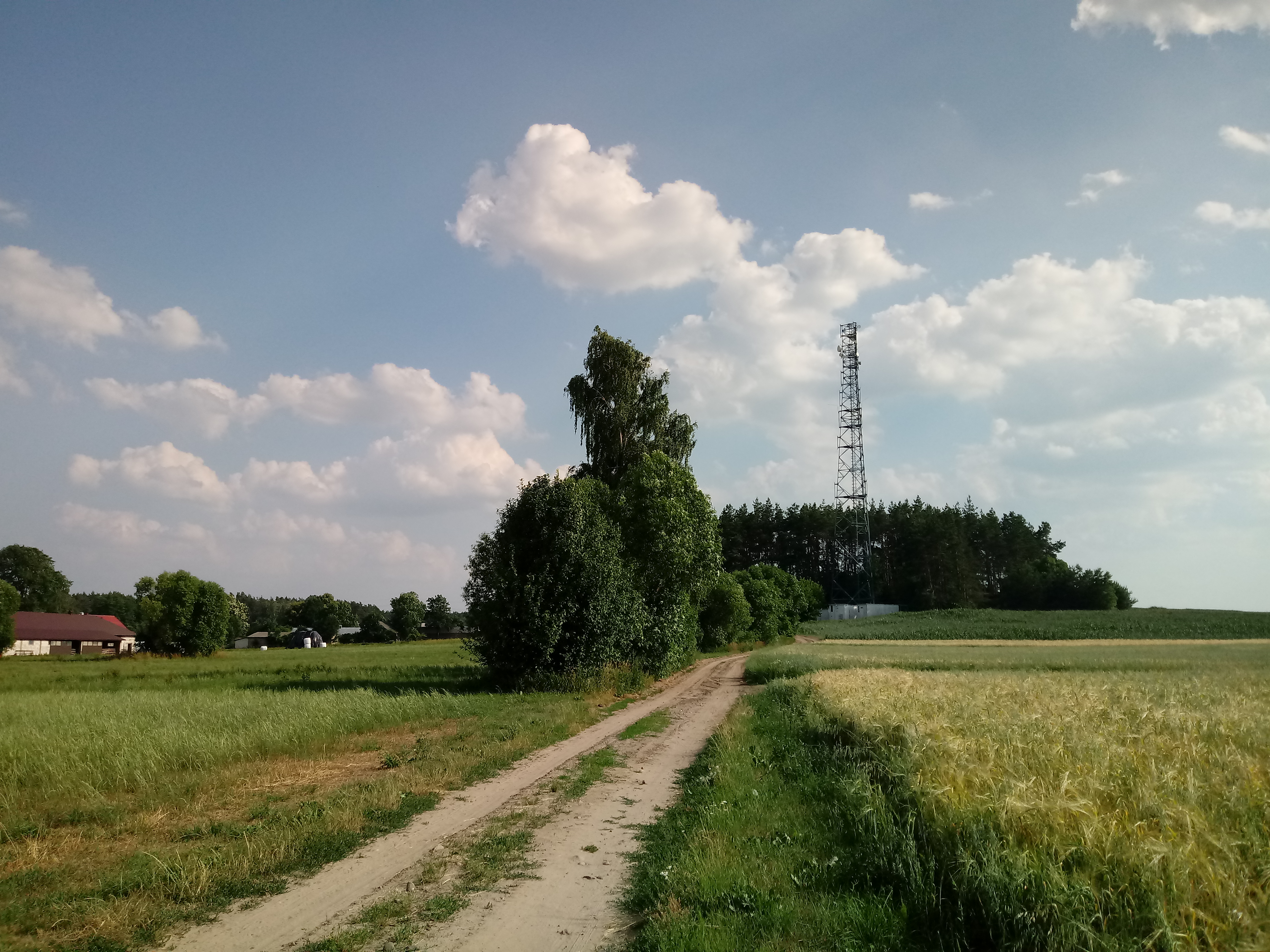

- Location within Poland
- Coordinates: 53°5′1″N 22°33′47″E
- Country: Poland
- Voivodeship: Podlaskie
- County: Zambrów
- Gmina: Rutki

Czochanie-Góra [t͡ʂɔˈxaɲɛ ˈɡura] is a village in the administrative district of Gmina Rutki, within Zambrów County, Podlaskie Voivodeship, in north-eastern Poland.
