= Wygoda, Łomża County =

Wygoda
- Village
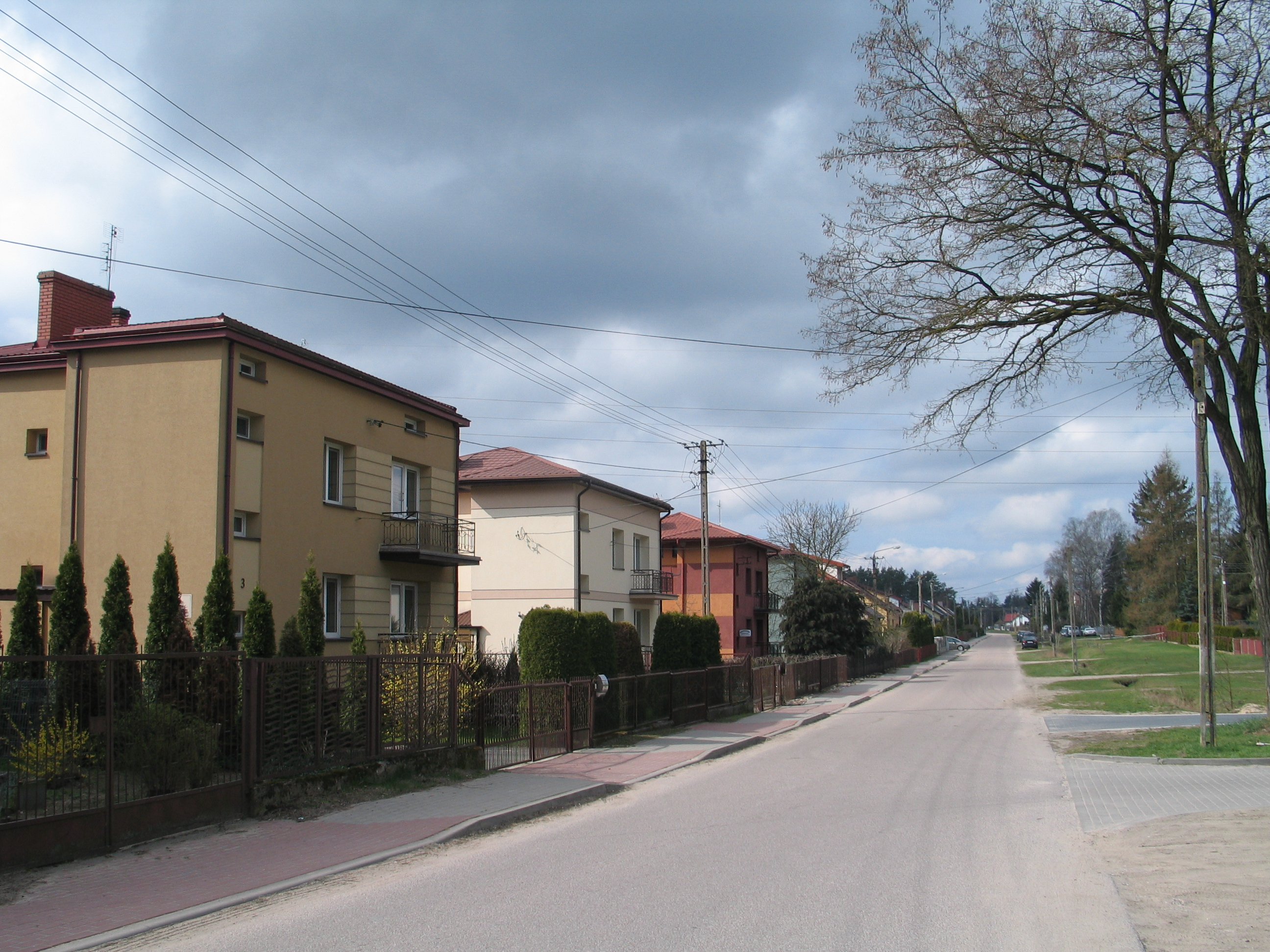

- Location within Poland
- Coordinates: 53°4′N 22°9′E
- Country: Poland
- Voivodeship: Podlaskie
- County: Łomża
- Gmina: Łomża
- Time zone: UTC+1 (CET)
  - Summer (DST): UTC+2 (CEST)
- Vehicle registration: BLM

Wygoda [vɨˈɡɔda] is a village in the administrative district of Gmina Łomża, within Łomża County, Podlaskie Voivodeship, in north-eastern Poland.

== History ==
During the Polish January Uprising, on July 21, 1863, the forest of Wygoda was the site of a Russian massacre of 50 unarmed young Poles, mostly students from Łomża who joined the uprising. The victims were tortured and murdered slowly in gruesome ways. They were undressed and tied to trees, some had their eyes gouged out, bones broken or insides torn out before they died.

After the joint German-Soviet invasion of Poland, which started World War II, the village was occupied by the Soviet Union from 1939 to 1941, and then by Nazi Germany from 1941 to 1944.
