= Gronostaje-Puszcza =

- Village
- Location within Poland
- Coordinates: 53°04′47″N 22°17′56″E
- Country: Poland
- Voivodeship: Podlaskie
- County: Zambrów
- Gmina: Rutki

Gronostaje-Puszcza [ɡrɔnɔsˈtajɛ ˈpuʂt͡ʂa] is a village in the administrative district of Gmina Rutki, within Zambrów County, Podlaskie Voivodeship, in north-eastern Poland.
