= Lutostań =

- Village
- Location within Poland
- Coordinates: 53°5′N 22°16′E
- Country: Poland
- Voivodeship: Podlaskie
- County: Łomża
- Gmina: Łomża
- Population: 180

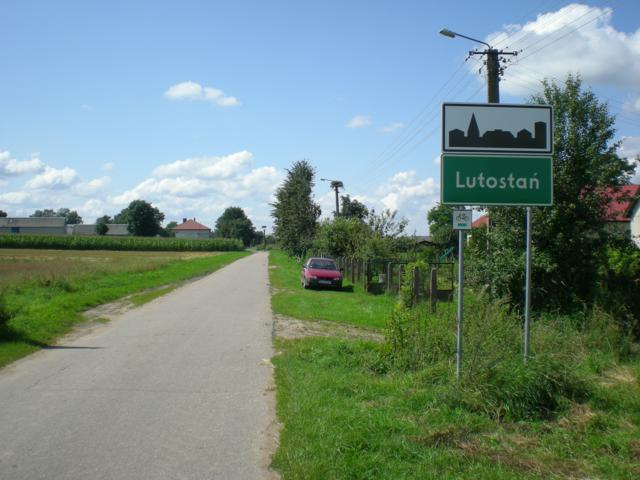
A plaque with the name of the village

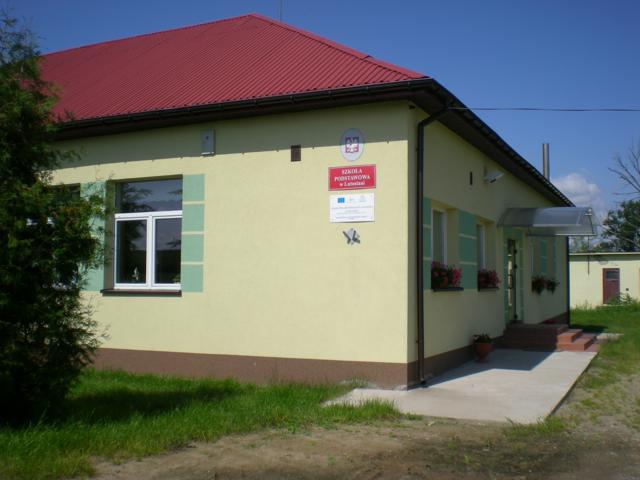
An elementary School in the village

Lutostań [luˈtɔstaɲ] is a village in the administrative district of Gmina Łomża, within Łomża County, Podlaskie Voivodeship, in north-eastern Poland.
