= Szlasy-Lipno =

- Village
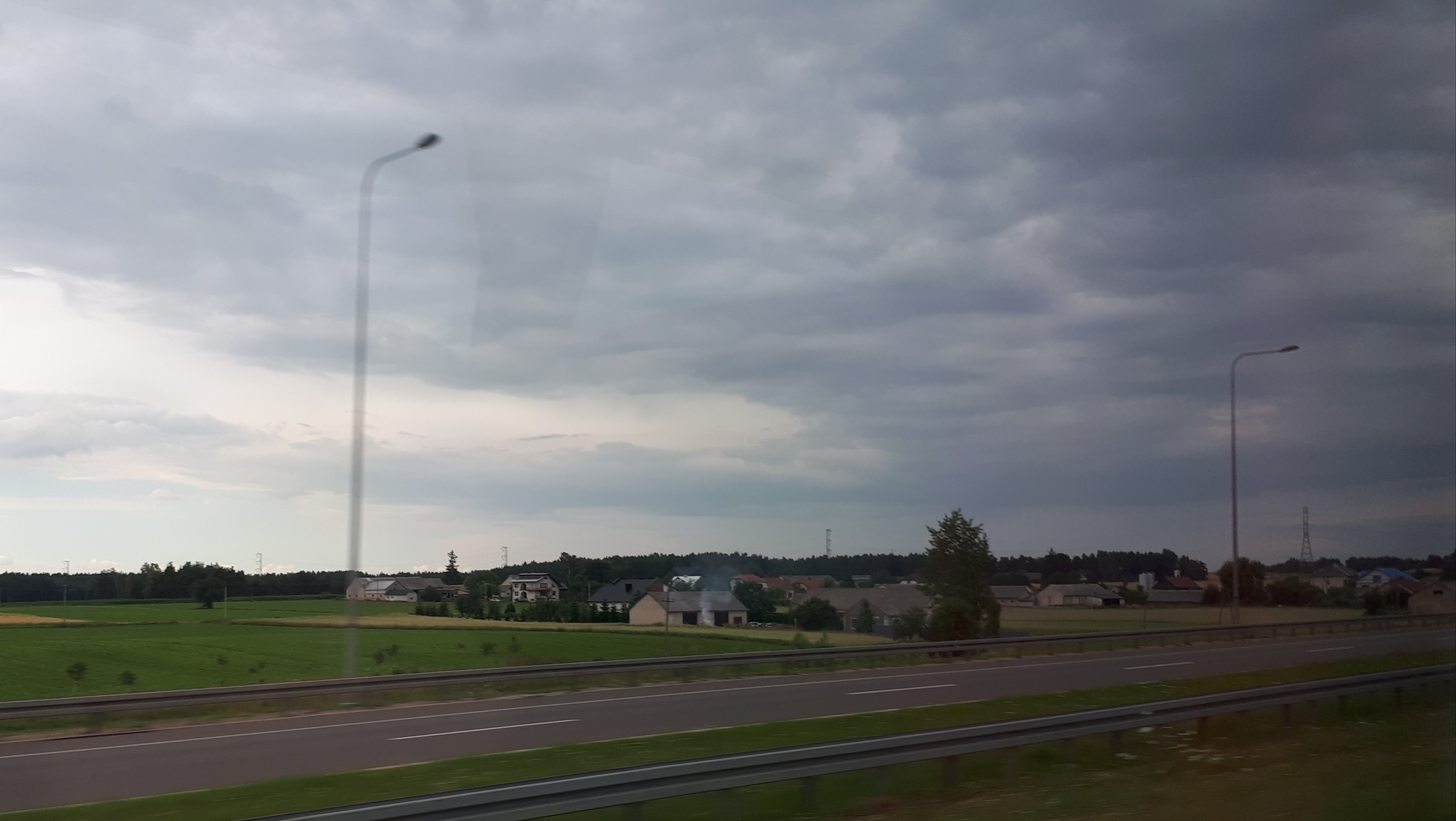

- Location within Poland
- Coordinates: 53°03′55″N 22°24′22″E
- Country: Poland
- Voivodeship: Podlaskie
- County: Zambrów
- Gmina: Rutki

Szlasy-Lipno [ˈʂlasɨ ˈlipnɔ] is a village in the administrative district of Gmina Rutki, within Zambrów County, Podlaskie Voivodeship, in north-eastern Poland.
