= Rutki-Nowiny =

- Village
- Location within Poland
- Coordinates: 53°04′31″N 22°25′28″E
- Country: Poland
- Voivodeship: Podlaskie
- County: Zambrów
- Gmina: Rutki

Rutki-Nowiny [ˈrutki nɔˈvinɨ] is a village in the administrative district of Gmina Rutki, within Zambrów County, Podlaskie Voivodeship, in north-eastern Poland.
