= Mikołajew, Podlaskie Voivodeship =

Settlement in Gmina Łomża, Poland

Mikołajew
- Settlement
- Location within Poland
- Coordinates: 53°06′34″N 22°01′44″E
- Country: Poland
- Voivodeship: Podlaskie
- County: Łomża
- Gmina: Łomża

Mikołajew [mikɔˈwajɛf] is a settlement in the administrative district of Gmina Łomża, within Łomża County, Podlaskie Voivodeship, in north-eastern Poland.
