= Zambrzyce-Kapusty =

- Village
- Location within Poland
- Coordinates: 53°05′57″N 22°33′35″E
- Country: Poland
- Voivodeship: Podlaskie
- County: Zambrów
- Gmina: Rutki

Zambrzyce-Kapusty [zamˈbʐɨt͡sɛ kaˈpustɨ] is a village in the administrative district of Gmina Rutki, in Zambrów County, Podlaskie Voivodeship, in north-eastern Poland.
