= Szlasy-Mieszki =

- Village
- Location within Poland
- Coordinates: 53°04′20″N 22°32′13″E
- Country: Poland
- Voivodeship: Podlaskie
- County: Zambrów
- Gmina: Rutki

Szlasy-Mieszki [ˈʂlasɨ ˈmjɛʂki] is a village in the administrative district of Gmina Rutki, within Zambrów County, Podlaskie Voivodeship, in north-eastern Poland.
