= Nowe Zambrzyce =

- Village
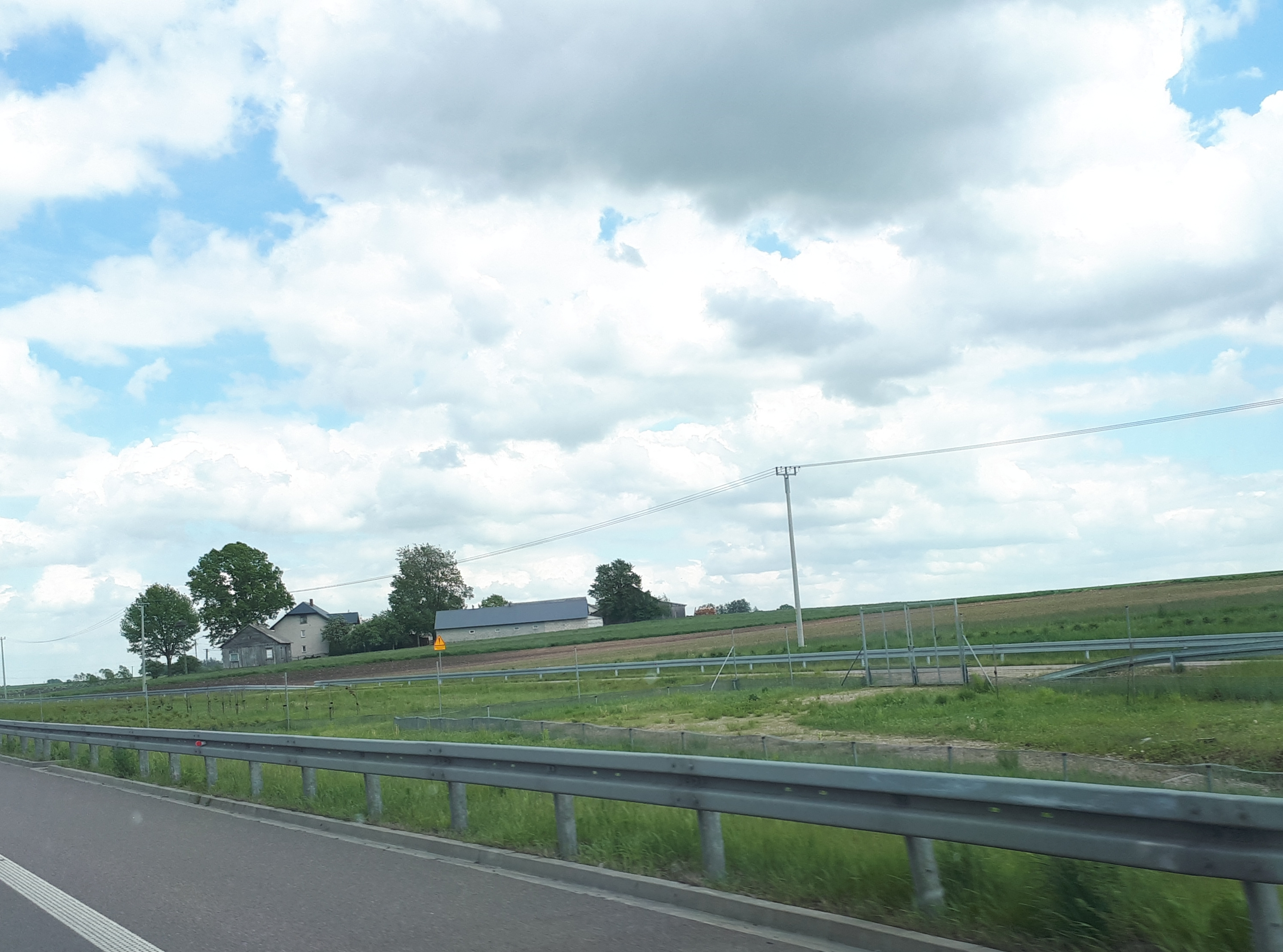

- Location within Poland
- Coordinates: 53°06′02″N 22°32′40″E
- Country: Poland
- Voivodeship: Podlaskie
- County: Zambrów
- Gmina: Rutki

Nowe Zambrzyce [ˈnɔvɛ zamˈbʐɨt͡sɛ] is a village in the administrative district of Gmina Rutki, within Zambrów County, Podlaskie Voivodeship, in north-eastern Poland.
