= Szlasy-Łopienite =

- Village
- Location within Poland
- Coordinates: 53°04′23″N 22°31′29″E
- Country: Poland
- Voivodeship: Podlaskie
- County: Zambrów
- Gmina: Rutki

Szlasy-Łopienite [ˈʂlasɨ wɔpjɛˈnitɛ] is a village in the administrative district of Gmina Rutki, within Zambrów County, Podlaskie Voivodeship, in north-eastern Poland.
