= Stare Sierzputy =

- Village
- Location within Poland
- Coordinates: 53°10′24″N 21°58′22″E
- Country: Poland
- Voivodeship: Podlaskie
- County: Łomża
- Gmina: Łomża

Stare Sierzputy [ˈstarɛ ɕɛʂˈputɨ] is a village in the administrative district of Gmina Łomża, within Łomża County, Podlaskie Voivodeship, in north-eastern Poland.
