= Dobrochy, Podlaskie Voivodeship =

Dobrochy
- Village
- Location within Poland
- Coordinates: 53°5′N 22°32′E
- Country: Poland
- Voivodeship: Podlaskie
- County: Zambrów
- Gmina: Rutki

Dobrochy [dɔˈbrɔxɨ] is a village in the administrative district of Gmina Rutki, within Zambrów County, Podlaskie Voivodeship, in north-eastern Poland.
