= Rutki-Kossaki =

- Village
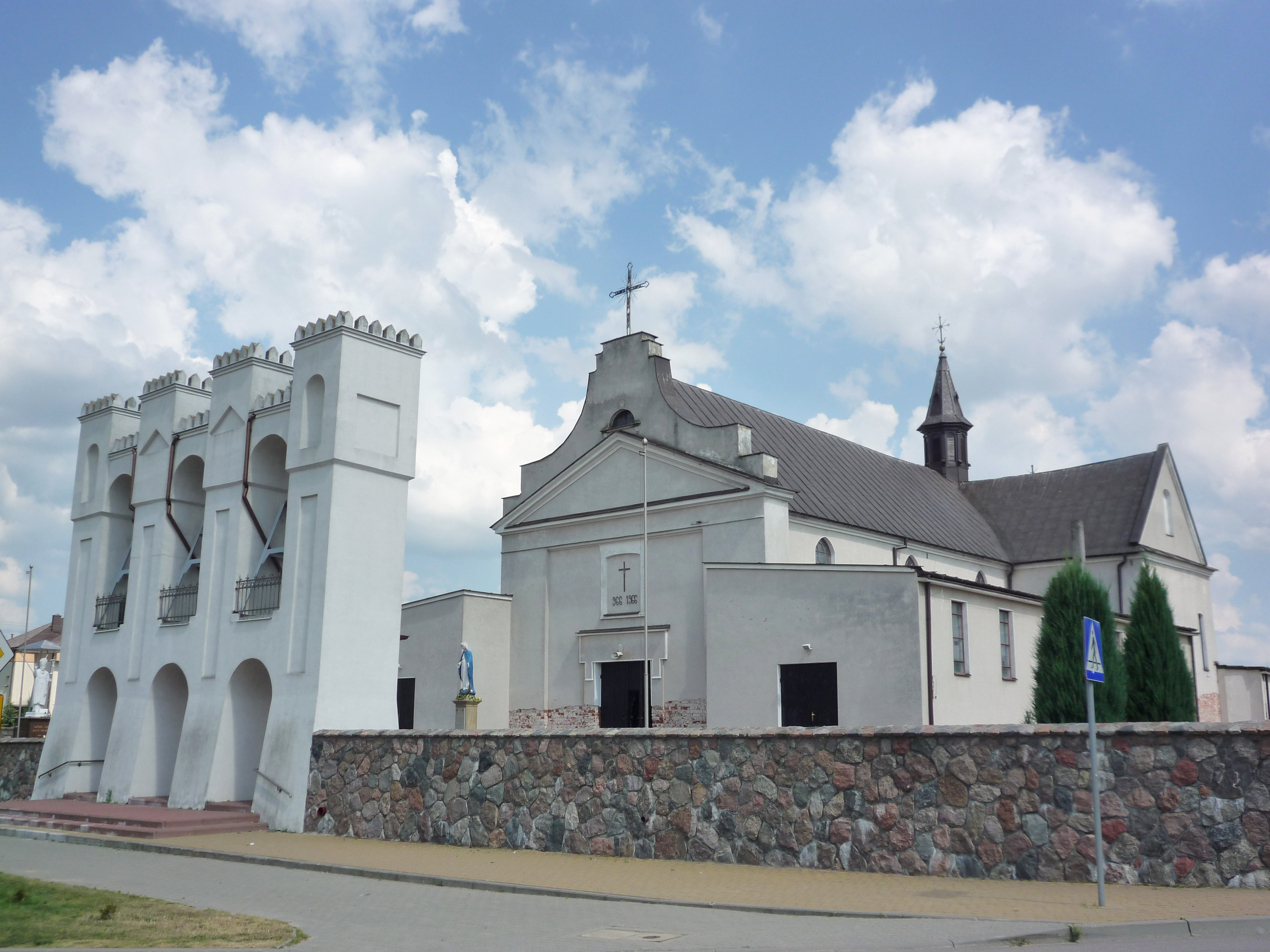
- Church of Saint Anne

- Location within Poland
- Coordinates: 53°5′N 22°26′E
- Country: Poland
- Voivodeship: Podlaskie
- County: Zambrów
- Gmina: Rutki
- Elevation: 50 m (160 ft)

Population
  - Total: 1,300
- Time zone: UTC+1 (CET)
  - Summer (DST): UTC+2 (CEST)
- Vehicle registration: BZA

Rutki-Kossaki [ˈrutki kɔsˈsaki] is a village in Zambrów County, Podlaskie Voivodeship, in north-eastern Poland. It is the seat of the gmina (administrative district) called Gmina Rutki.

== History ==
The village was the ancestral seat of the Rutkowski noble family. In 1760 it was granted town rights, which, however, were revoked in 1801.

Following the German-Soviet invasion of Poland, which started World War II in September 1939, the village was occupied by the Soviet Union until 1941 and then by Germany until 1944. Polish partisans of the Home Army were active in the village and area. On May 1944, they attacked a German military post in the village, and on 26 June 1944, they liberated a group of prisoners from German captivity near the village.
