= Chojny Młode =

- Village
- Location within Poland
- Coordinates: 53°9′26″N 21°56′01″E
- Country: Poland
- Voivodeship: Podlaskie
- County: Łomża
- Gmina: Łomża

Chojny Młode [ˈxɔi̯nɨ ˈmwɔdɛ] is a village in the administrative district of Gmina Łomża, within Łomża County, Podlaskie Voivodeship, in north-eastern Poland.
