= Czaplice, Podlaskie Voivodeship =

Czaplice
- Village
- Location within Poland
- Coordinates: 53°6′30″N 21°59′31″E
- Country: Poland
- Voivodeship: Podlaskie
- County: Łomża
- Gmina: Łomża

Czaplice [t͡ʂaˈplit͡sɛ] is a village in the administrative district of Gmina Łomża, within Łomża County, Podlaskie Voivodeship, in north-eastern Poland.
