= Puchały, Podlaskie Voivodeship =

Puchały
- Village
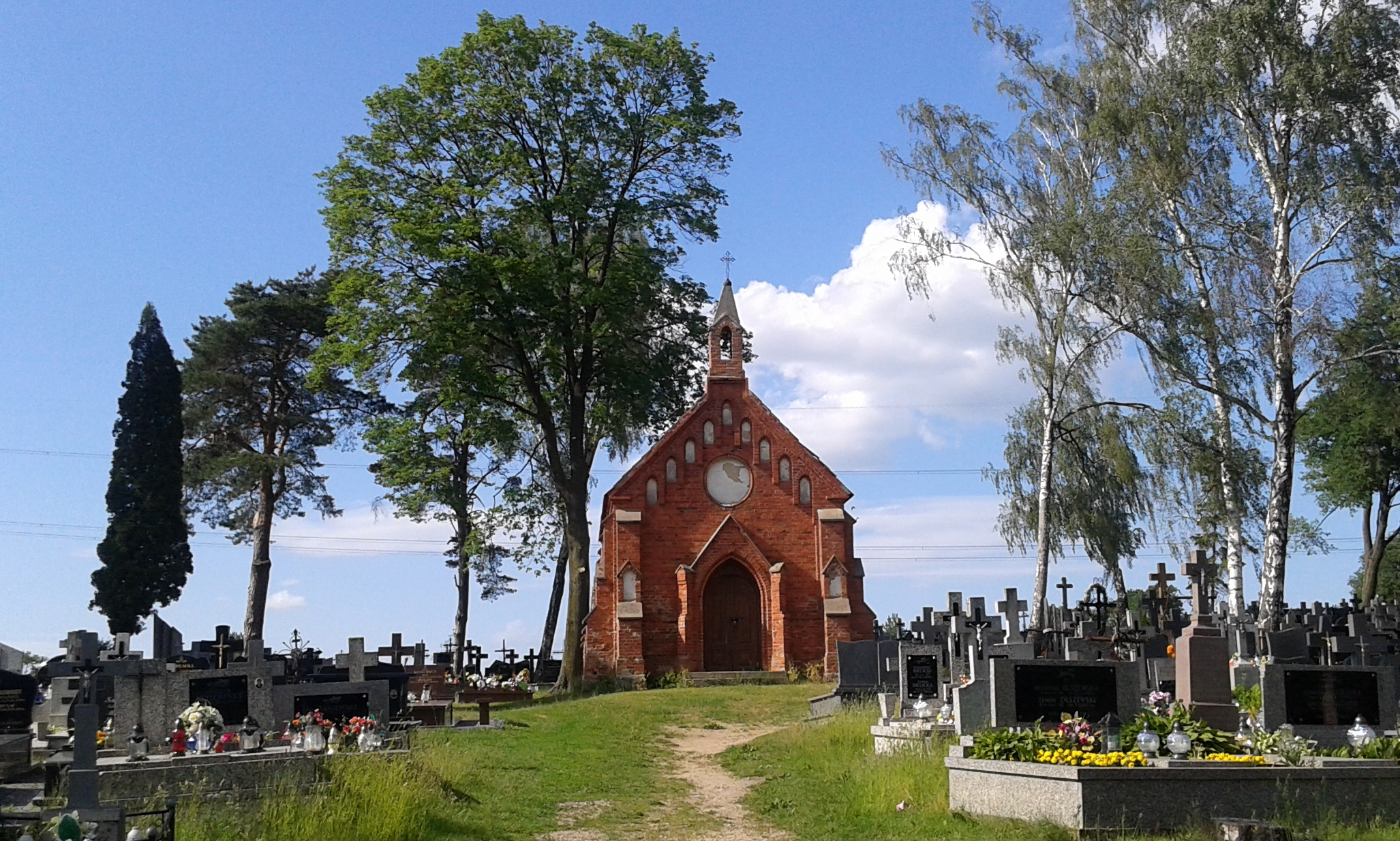
- Cemetery in Puchały

- Location within Poland
- Coordinates: 53°4′32″N 22°13′27″E
- Country: Poland
- Voivodeship: Podlaskie
- County: Łomża
- Gmina: Łomża

Puchały [puˈxawɨ] is a village in the administrative district of Gmina Łomża, within Łomża County, Podlaskie Voivodeship, in north-eastern Poland.
