= Kołomyja, Podlaskie Voivodeship =

Kołomyja
- Village
- Location within Poland
- Coordinates: 53°5′N 22°22′E
- Country: Poland
- Voivodeship: Podlaskie
- County: Zambrów
- Gmina: Rutki

Kołomyja [kɔwɔˈmɨja] is a village in the administrative district of Gmina Rutki, within Zambrów County, Podlaskie Voivodeship, in north-eastern Poland.
