= Rubinówka =

Place in Poland

- Settlement
- Location within Poland
- Coordinates: 53°03′37″N 22°09′34″E
- Country: Poland
- Voivodeship: Podlaskie
- County: Łomża
- Gmina: Łomża

Rubinówka [rubiˈnufka] is a settlement in the administrative district of Gmina Łomża, within Łomża County, Podlaskie Voivodeship, in north-eastern Poland.
