= Jaworki, Podlaskie Voivodeship =

Jaworki
- Village
- Location within Poland
- Coordinates: 53°6′56″N 22°32′52″E
- Country: Poland
- Voivodeship: Podlaskie
- County: Zambrów
- Gmina: Rutki
- Population: 20

Jaworki [jaˈvɔrki] is a village in the administrative district of Gmina Rutki, within Zambrów County, Podlaskie Voivodeship, in north-eastern Poland.
