= Stare Chojny =

- Village
- Location within Poland
- Coordinates: 53°10′10″N 21°56′17″E
- Country: Poland
- Voivodeship: Podlaskie
- County: Łomża
- Gmina: Łomża

Stare Chojny [ˈstarɛ ˈxɔi̯nɨ] is a village in the administrative district of Gmina Łomża, within Łomża County, Podlaskie Voivodeship, in north-eastern Poland.
