= Szczepankowo, Podlaskie Voivodeship =

Szczepankowo
- Village
- Location within Poland
- Coordinates: 53°8′N 21°57′E
- Country: Poland
- Voivodeship: Podlaskie
- County: Łomża
- Gmina: Śniadowo
- Population: 460

Szczepankowo [ʂt͡ʂɛpaŋˈkɔvɔ] is a village in the administrative district of Gmina Śniadowo, within Łomża County, Podlaskie Voivodeship, in north-eastern Poland.

== Graveyard ==
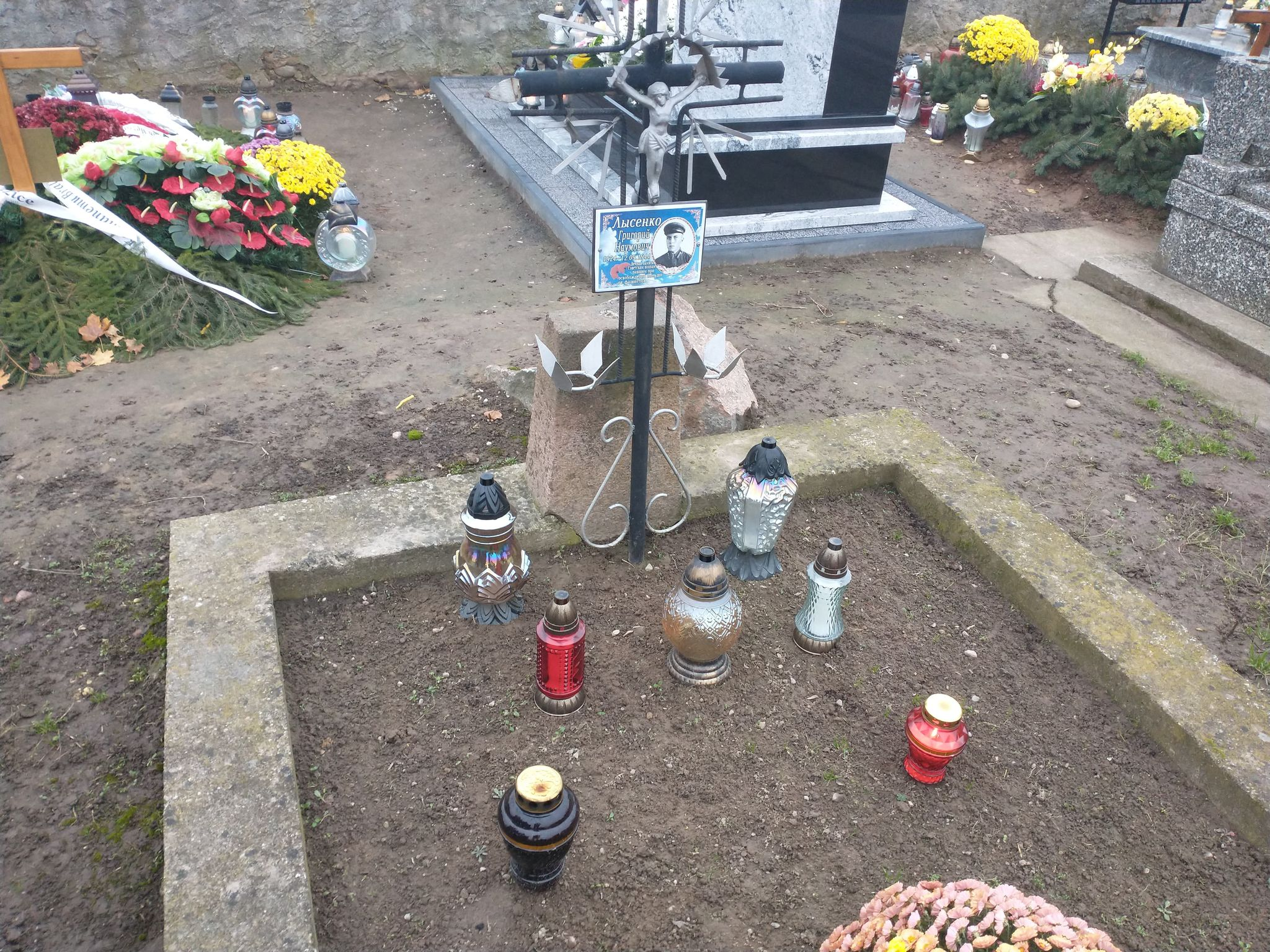
Russian soldiers' grave at parish graveyard.

In parish cemetery is located Russian soldiers' grave fallen in battle against Germans of Szczepankowo in 1944.
