= Battle of Brześć Litewski =

1939 battle of the Invasion of Poland in WWII

- Part of the invasion of Poland
- Map showing the advance of German XIX Corps on Brześć Litewski.
Date	14–17 September 1939
Location	Brześć Litewski, Polesie Voivodeship, Poland (now Belarus)
Result	German victory

Belligerents
Germany	Poland

Commanders and leaders
(Nazi Germany) Heinz Guderian	(Second Polish Republic) Konstanty Plisowski

Units involved
(Nazi Germany) XIX Panzer Corps: 10th Panzer Division; 3rd Panzer Division; 20th Infantry Division	(Poland) Brześć defense group

Strength
+70 tanks and AFVs unknown number of infantry	3 infantry battalions 1 engineering battalion 2 armored trains 15 FT-17 tanks Artillery

Casualties and losses
Unknown	1,000 killed, wounded and captured 15 tanks destroyed

The Battle of Brześć Litewski (also known as the siege of Brześć, the battle of Brest-Litovsk or simply the battle of Brześć) was a World War II battle involving German and Polish forces that took place between 14 and 17 September 1939, near the town of Brześć Litewski, Poland (now Brest, Belarus). After three days of heavy fights for the stronghold in the town of Brześć, the Germans captured the fortress and the Poles withdrew.

== History ==
=== Before the battle ===
Initially, the Polish forces did not plan to defend the old fortress of Brześć. The town was located deep behind the Polish lines and was seen as a supply depot and organisation centre rather than a front-line fort. However, after the Battles of Mława and Wizna the German XIX Panzer Corps under General Heinz Guderian broke through Polish lines and sped southward with the aim of flanking Warsaw from the East and cutting Poland in two.

According to the secret protocol of the Molotov–Ribbentrop Pact of 23 August 1939, the region of Brześć was assigned to the Soviet "sphere of influence". However, the Soviets did not begin their invasion of Poland yet, and had the rapidly advancing German corps stopped, it would give Poles time to regroup and prepare. Already on 8 September the German foreign minister, Joachim von Ribbentrop, notified the Soviet government that the German forces would have to violate the Soviet "sphere".

The ancient fortress of Brześć is at the confluence of Muchawiec and Bug Rivers. Occupying the site of a medieval castle, it was strengthened and reconstructed in Napoleonic times and then again in 1847. Heavily damaged during World War I, the fortress was turned into a matériel depot and its central part into a prison. Although largely obsolete by contemporary standards, the fortress occupied a strategic position in the Polish lines and its defence could prevent German forces from crossing Polesia into Lesser Poland and Galicia to the south.

The aim of the German XIX Corps was to seize the fortress in order to prevent elements of a divided Independent Operational Group Narew under General Młot-Fijałkowski from retreating southwards and joining the rest of the Polish forces. The German forces consisted of an entire armoured corps: the 3rd Panzer, 2nd Motorised and 20th Motorised Divisions.

At the end of the summer the fortress was housing the march battalions of 82nd and 35th infantry regiments and elements of various smaller units. Moreover, a large number of newly mobilised reservists started to arrive at the fortress, awaiting forward deployment to their units. From these units General Konstanty Plisowski organized a force of roughly three infantry battalions, aided by an engineering battalion, several batteries of artillery and two companies of old FT-17 tanks used for training, Nos. 112 and 113.

=== Opposing forces ===
The city of Brześć was defended by a small improvised force under General Plisowski. The Polish forces consisted of three infantry battalions, one engineering battalion, some artillery and were assisted by two armoured trains (designated PP55 and PP53) commanded by Captains Mieczysław Malinowski and Andrzej Podgórski.

The German forces consisted of the entire XIX Panzer Corps under General Heinz Guderian.

=== Battle ===
On 14 September 77 German tanks of the 2nd Battalion of the 8th Panzer Regiment, part of 10th Panzer Division, reached the area of Brześć and attempted to capture the fortress on the run. The probe attack was repelled by Polish infantry and the 113th Light Tank Company, consisting of 12 obsolete Renault FT tanks. All the Polish tanks were destroyed, but the German forces were forced to retreat towards their initial positions. Polish armoured train number 53 (PP53), which made a reconnaissance advance to Wysokie Litewskie, was attacked by a scout patrol from the 10th Panzer Division. The crew from the train opened fire with artillery. Several other skirmishes were fought, but were largely inconclusive.

Later that day the German artillery arrived and started bombardment of both the fortress and the town. Heavy street fighting ensued. At dawn approximately half of the town was in German hands, the other half being defended by Polish infantry. Polish anti-tank weapons, artillery and AA guns were very scarce and were unable provide enough support for the infantry. The following day Polish defenders withdrew from the town, but heavy casualties on both sides prevented the German units from continuing the attacks on the fortress. Instead, it was constantly shelled with artillery and bombed by the Luftwaffe.

When reports told Polish General Plisowski that scout elements from the 3rd Panzer Division were seen near the railway station at Żabinka, north of Kobryń, he sent PP55 to prevent his forces from being cut off. A platoon of five scout tanks left the train near Żabinka and attacked German armoured cars near a bridge on Muchawiec River. After three tanks were lost, the other two withdrew. A further attack by an assault platoon from the train failed. After a combined attack of the assault platoon and PP55 artillery, the Germans left the area of the Muchawiec bridge. When they returned, PP55 attacked another battle group of the 3rd Panzer Division (consisting of scout elements and the 5th Tank Regiment, supported by the 6th Battery of the 75th light artillery Regiment). After destroying a few armoured cars, the train withdrew towards Brześć and the train station was left in German hands.

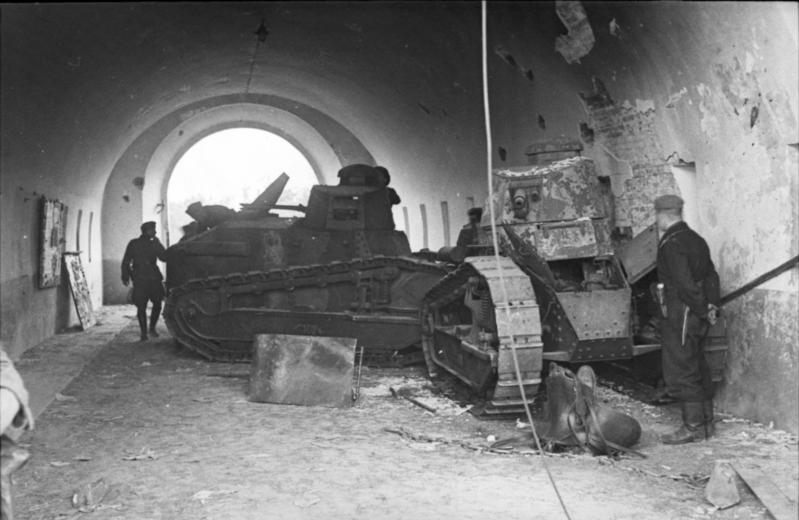
A gate to the northern island of the fortress blocked by the FT tanks

The main assault finally started in the early morning of 16 September. The defenders had plenty of small arms ammunition and light arms thanks to the munitions depot in the fortress, but had almost no anti-tank weapons and insufficient artillery cover.

Although the German infantry was repelled and the assault of German tanks was stopped by two FT tanks sealing the northern gate of the fortress, by nightfall it became apparent that the German pressure made the situation very grave. Despite heavy losses, the German 20th Motorized Division and 10th Armoured Division captured the northern part of the citadel. Meanwhile, the combined 3rd Armoured Division and 2nd Armoured Division comprising the XXIInd Armoured Corps entered the area. The Poles were unable to resupply and the casualties rose to almost 40%.

At dawn General Plisowski ordered part of the Polish forces to retreat from the easternmost fortifications and regroup to the other side of the river and southwards. The evacuation was completed by early morning, 17 September when the last unit crossing the bridge blew it up to hinder the Germans. An hour later elements of the German 76th infantry regiment entered the fortress – almost unopposed.

== Aftermath ==
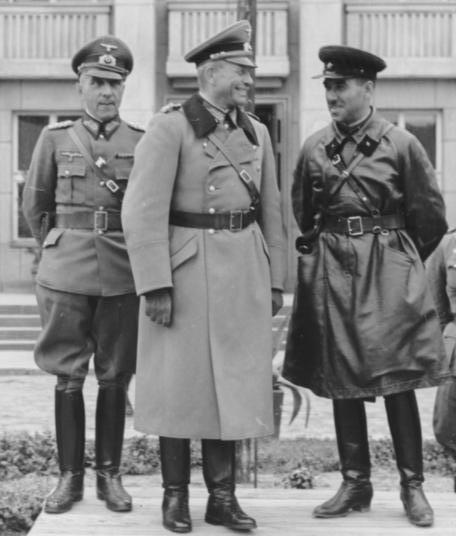
Joint parade of the Wehrmacht and Red Army in Brest at the end of the Invasion of Poland. At the center Major General Heinz Guderian and Brigadier Semyon Krivoshein

On 17 September 1939 the Red Army crossed the Polish border and started its quick advance westwards. The Soviet 29th tank brigade under Brigadier Semyon Krivoshein reached the area of Brześć later that day and took over the fortress from the Wehrmacht. During that event a joint German-Soviet parade was held in the town, after which the German forces left the area, crossed the Bug River and started their pursuit of the fleeing forces of general Plisowski.

Some 40 kilometres (25 miles) to the east the Polish improvised "Kobryń" Infantry Division under Colonel Epler was ordered to retreat in tandem with Plisowski. After the Battle of Kobryń the division evaded encirclement and joined the forces of General Plisowski. The Polish forces were soon joined by the Podlaska Cavalry Brigade and together started to make their way towards Lwów and the Romanian Bridgehead. Under command of General Franciszek Kleeberg they formed the bulwark of the remaining Polish Army, fighting effectively against both the Wehrmacht and Red Army until the Battle of Kock, that ended on 6 October 1939.

The Brest Fortress was handed over to the Soviets in accordance with the Molotov-Ribbentrop Pact. It was besieged and captured again by the Wehrmacht in the beginning of Operation Barbarossa conducted against Soviet Union in 1941.

== See also ==
- List of World War II military equipment of Poland
- List of German military equipment of World War II
