= Battle of Kobryń =

Battle in WW2

- Part of Invasion of Poland
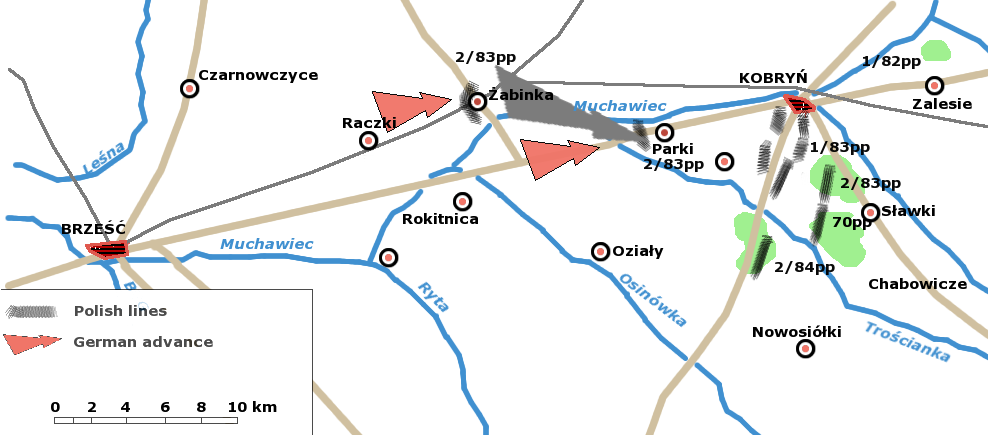
- Polish and German positions on 17 September (see image description for details)
Date	14–18 September 1939
Location	Kobryn, Polesie Voivodeship, Poland (Now Kobryn, Belarus) 52°13′N 24°21′E
Result	Inconclusive

Belligerents
Germany	Poland

Commanders and leaders
(Nazi Germany) Heinz Guderian	(Second Polish Republic) Adam Epler

Units involved
(Nazi Germany) XIX Panzer Corps: 2nd Motorized Infantry Division	(Second Polish Republic) Operational Group "Polesie": 60th Reserve Infantry Division

Casualties and losses
Unknown	Unknown

The Battle of Kobryń was one of the battles of the Invasion of Poland. It was fought between 14 and 18 September 1939, between the German XIX Panzer Corps of General Heinz Guderian and the improvised Polish 60th Infantry Division "Kobryn" of Colonel Adam Epler. It was fought concurrently with the Battle of Brześć Litewski.

== Eve of the battle ==
For a detailed description of the situation prior to the battle see: Battle of Brześć

After breaking through the Polish defences in the Battle of Wizna, the German forces under General Heinz Guderian started to make their way towards Brześć, Kowel and Kobryń. Their aim was to cut the Polish territory in two parts and paralyse the Polish attempts to organise a line of defence east of the Bug River.

== Battle ==
On 14 September 1939, elements of the XIX Panzer Corps reached the area of Brześć and Kobryń. Brześć was defended by a small force under General Konstanty Plisowski, while Kobryń was defended by the improvised 60th Infantry Division of Colonel Adam Epler.

In the early morning of 14 September Colonel Epler received a report of German forces entering the area. Elements of the German XIX Panzer Corps (elements of 3rd Panzer Division and entire 2nd Motorised Infantry Division) were advancing rapidly and Epler suspected that the Germans would advance on the towns of Brześć and Kobryń, as well as toward an important railway node located in the village of Żabinka. To probe the enemy forces, he ordered the 2nd battalion of his 84th Infantry Regiment to commence a delaying action in the area of Żabinka train station and the villages of Tewela and Ogrodniki. At the same time, the 2nd battalion of 83rd Infantry Regiment was ordered to organise a defensive line along the swampy shores of Trościanica river to cover the eastern flank of the Polish forces in the area of Brześć, some 30 kilometres westward.

On 15 September the German 3rd Armoured Division encountered and destroyed a column of the 9th reserve light artillery depot. However, Epler's forces were not spotted until late evening of that day, when they were bombarded by the Luftwaffe. The following day the main force of the German XIX Corps arrived. The 2nd Battalion of the 84th Infantry Regiment together with an armoured train organised an ambush and attacked the Germans who were supported by a battery of artillery. Following six hours of combat, the Germans were forced to retreat with significant casualties. The Polish battalion seized several guns and tanks, but had to burn them due to lack of fuel and then retreated toward the main line of Polish defenses.

At dawn on 17 September 1939 the reconnaissance units of the German 2nd Motorised Infantry Division finally reached the Polish lines. After a short skirmish, the Poles withdrew behind the defensive positions guarded by the 2nd battalion of the 83rd Infantry Regiment. The Germans then tried to outflank the Poles by attacking the cemetery in the village of Chwedkowice, but were repelled with light losses, mostly due to direct fire from the Polish 100mm howitzers. The 2nd Motorised Division lost three or four armoured cars and was forced to retreat. The Polish battalion withdrew towards the village of Piaski, where it organised another ambush. In the afternoon it was again attacked by the elements of German 2nd Motorised Division, but this assault was also repelled.

17 September also marked the beginning of the Soviet invasion of Poland.

Overnight, the Polish forces fighting in the Battle of Brześć were withdrawn to the other side of the Bug River and joined the forces of Independent Operational Group Polesie under General Franciszek Kleeberg. Elements of the Polish forces arrived at Kobryń, but the defense of the area lost much of its strategic significance. Colonel Epler decided to defend the area as long as possible, and then retreat southwards, following the General Kleeberg's forces.

The main battle for Kobryń began on 18 September 1939. Early in the fighting, the Germans managed to capture the Gubernia I and Gubernia II manorial farms, which were protecting the road to Bereza Kartuska and closing the approach to main forces of the Polish division. A counterattack by Polish forces from Kobryń forced the retreat of the Germans from one of the manorial farms, but it was later recaptured. Fierce combat broke out near the Queen Bona Canal. The Germans were unable to seize complete control of Kobryń on September 18 because of Polish army resistance, resulting in an impasse.

During the day, Polish patrols and units of the eastern wing of Independent Operational Group "Polesie" came into contact with advanced units of the Soviet Army 23rd Rifle Corps in the area of Łuniniec.

Faced with the knowledge of the broader Soviet Invasion of Poland pouring in from the frontline and specific reports from units of IOG "Polesie" encountering advanced units of Red Army forces, General Franciszek Kleeberg amalgamated all units of IOG "Polesie" under his command with the improvised 60th Infantry Division and withdrew to the South towards the Pinsk Marshes in the area of Dywin. The headquarters of GO "Polesie" was relocated from Pińsk to Lubieszów, at present Lubeshiv in Ukraine.

With the withdrawal of Polish forces, the battle for Kobryń came to an end.

== See also ==
- List of World War II military equipment of Poland
- List of German military equipment of World War II
