= Zhabinka Ghetto =

Nazi ghetto in occupied Belarus

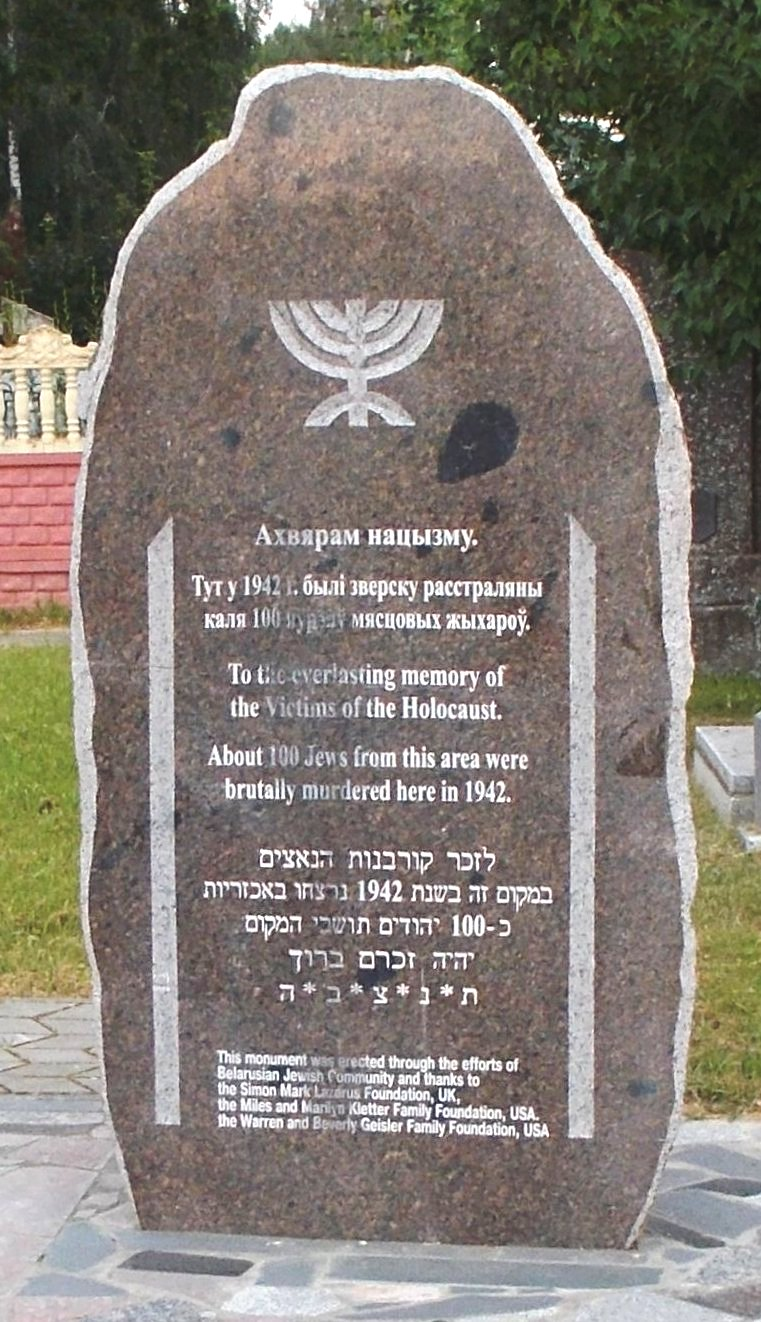
- Location: Zhabinka
- Date: 1941 — October 21, 1942

Zhabinka Ghetto (1941 — October 21, 1942) was a Nazi Jewish ghetto and a place of forced relocation for the Jews of the town of Zhabinka in the Zhabinka district of the Brest region during the persecution and extermination of Jews under the Nazi occupation of Belarus during World War II.

== History ==
Before the war, there were 820 Jews in the town of Zhabinka, making up 57.8% of the population. The town was captured by German troops on June 23, 1941, and remained under occupation for over three years, until July 21, 1944. Upon occupying the town, the Nazis destroyed the synagogue with a tank on the same day. Implementing Hitler's plan for the "Final Solution" to the Jewish question, the Germans immediately began killing Jews. The head of the police in Zhabinka, appointed by the Germans, was "Gudyma", a former officer of the Red Army. The Nazis then herded 1,500 Jews (locals and refugees from other places) into the Zhabinka ghetto. The territory of the Zhabinka ghetto was an area fenced with barbed wire near a swamp on Kobrin Street (now Communist Street), where there were two old synagogues and several semi-destroyed houses without windows and doors.

P. K. Ponomarenko, the party leader of Belarus, reported on the situation in the occupied regions of Belarus on August 19, 1941, informing the Soviet leadership: "The Jewish population is being mercilessly exterminated... In Zhabinka, 16 Jews were harnessed to a gun and, driven with whips, forced to drag the gun along a sandy road... Such facts are numerous." The Germans and police killed almost all the inmates of the Zhabinka ghetto. 339 Jews were taken and exterminated in the Malorita ghetto, and some Jews were killed in the village of Otechizna (now the settlement of Leninsky). On October 21, 1942, the last approximately 100 Jews of Zhabinka were shot in the Mukhina Yama tract on the outskirts of the town. Among the Jews killed in Zhabinka was Malka Shliomovna Vysotskaya (married name Duksina), the sister of Vladimir Vysotsky's paternal grandfather.

== Cases of rescue and Righteous Among the Nations ==
Local resident, Polish woman Floria Budishevskaya, hid two Jews in her house for almost two years — 12-year-old Roma Levin and her friend Sonia Fefer. In 1944, on the eve of the liberation of the town from the occupiers, a policeman discovered Sonia and killed her. The boy managed to escape and survived. Floria was shot after brutal torture for hiding Jews. She was awarded the honorary title "Righteous Among the Nations" by the Israeli memorial institute Yad Vashem "in deepest gratitude for the help given to the Jewish people during World War II."

The Grinberg family, from the moment the Zhabinka ghetto was established, managed to hide in the basement of a school. They made an arrangement with a neighbor that she would supply them with food for a fee. When the Grinbergs ran out of valuables, the neighbor began adding arsenic to the food she brought to get rid of the now "useless" and dangerous burden. Grinberg's wife, a pharmacist by profession, realized this, and her son Jack, then a teenager, slapped the woman. The "savior" was warned that if she betrayed them, she would also have to die for helping Jews. Many years later, after the war, Jack visited Zhabinka and met the woman, who, recalling the incident, said that the slap "still burns."

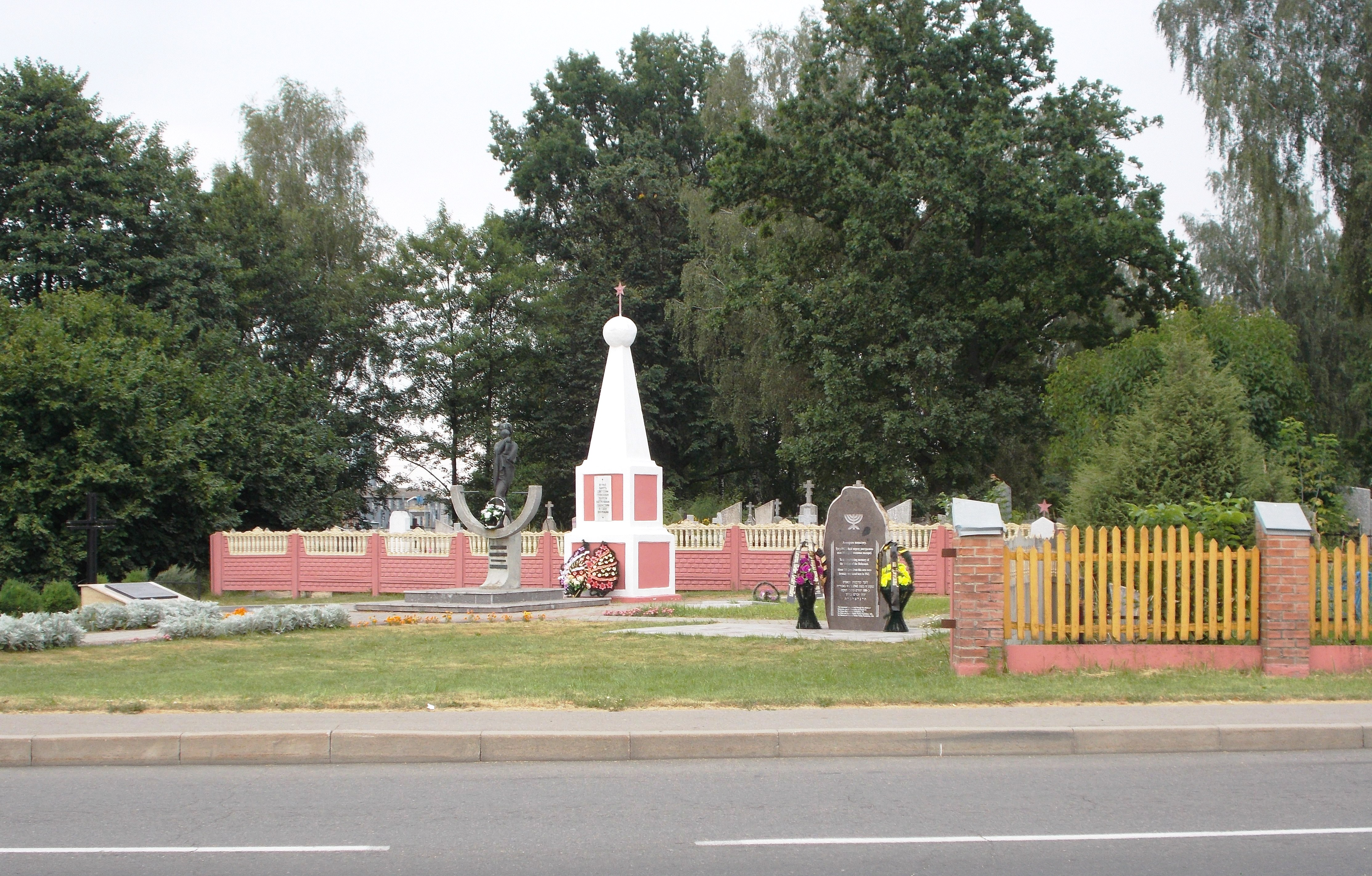

== Memory ==
In total, about 800 Jews were killed in Zhabinka during the Holocaust. A monument was erected for them in 1956.

== Additional sources ==
=== Books and articles ===
- V. Sarychev. "In search of lost time"
- S. S. Smirnov. Boy from Brest

=== Archival sources ===
- State Archive of the Russian Federation (GARF), — fund 7021, inventory 83, case 238, sheets 112-113;
- AU KGB of the Brest region, — fund 9, inventory 24, case 74, volume 2, sheet 122;
