= 60th Infantry Division (Poland) =

Polish 60th Infantry Division was an infantry division of the Polish Army, which fought in the September 1939 Invasion of Poland. This unit, which was first named Division Kobryn, was not part of peacetime organization of the army, and was created in mid-September 1939, out of reserve units of Military District IX. It was formed in the town of Kobryn, and guns and ammunition for the division were delivered by Warsaw city buses, from Central Ammunition Depot Nr 2 in Stawy near Dęblin. The division was commanded by Colonel Adam Epler.

In mid-September 1939, Division Kobryn was incorporated into Independent Operational Group Polesie, commanded by General Franciszek Kleeberg. It entered action on September 14, when it clashed with advancing Wehrmacht along the road from Brzesc nad Bugiem to Kobryn. On September 18, it fought the Germans in Kobryn, and retreated southwest, to join the Polesie Group.

On September 28 near Włodawa, following an order of General Kleeberg, Division Kobryn was officially renamed into 60th Infantry Division. It took part in all battles and skirmishes of Independent Operational Group Polesie: on September 28–30, it defeated the Red Army near Jablon and Milanow, on October 1–2 it fought the Wehrmacht near Serokomla. On October 3, 1939, the division entered forests north of Wola Gułowska, and two days later, reinforced by Cavalry Brigade Edward (Colonel Edward Milewski), it attacked German positions in Wola Gułowska and Helenów. On October 6, the division capitulated together with all units of the Polesie Group.

== Sources ==
- Ludwik Głowacki, Działania wojenne na Lubelszczyźnie w roku 1939, Wydawnictwo Lubelskie, wyd. II, Warszawa 1986, ISBN 83-222-0377-2
- Adam Epler, Ostatni żołnierz polski kampanii roku 1939, reprint wydania z 1942, ARS-HIT Sp. z o.o. Centrum Wydawniczo-Handlowe, Warszawa 1989
- Jan Wróblewski, Samodzielna Grupa Operacyjna "Polesie" 1939, Wydawnictwo MON, Warszawa 1989, ISBN 978-83-11-07659-4
- Tadeusz Jurga: Wojsko Polskie : krótki informator historyczny o Wojsku Polskim w latach II wojny światowej. 7, Regularne jednostki Wojska Polskiego w 1939 : organizacja, działania bojowe, uzbrojenie, metryki związków operacyjnych, dywizji i brygad. Warszawa : Wydawnictwo Ministerstwa Obrony Narodowej 1975

== See also ==
- Polish army order of battle in 1939
- Polish contribution to World War II
