= VGM Group Spółka =

Polish property developer

- Native name: VGM Group Spółka z ograniczoną odpowiedzialnością
- Type: Private company
- Industry: Real estate development Construction
- Founded: 2018
- Headquarters: Warsaw, Poland,
- Area served: Poland, Belarus
- Key people: Ilya Volakh (owner)
- Products: Residential developments
- Website: vgm-group.pl

VGM Group Spółka sp. z o.o. (Full name VGM Group Spółka spółka z ograniczoną odpowiedzialnością, Złota 61 / 100, 00-819 Warszawa, Polska) is a Polish real estate development and construction company headquartered in Warsaw, Poland. The company was founded in 2018 and has been associated with residential development projects in Poland and Belarus.

The company previously received criticism regarding regarding delays and legal disputes involving developments in Belarus.

== History ==
VGM Group Spółka sp. z o.o. was founded in 2018 in Warsaw, Poland. While the company mainly operates in Poland, it has also been associated with projects in Belarus through entities connected to its ownership structure.

== Projects ==
=== Belarus ===
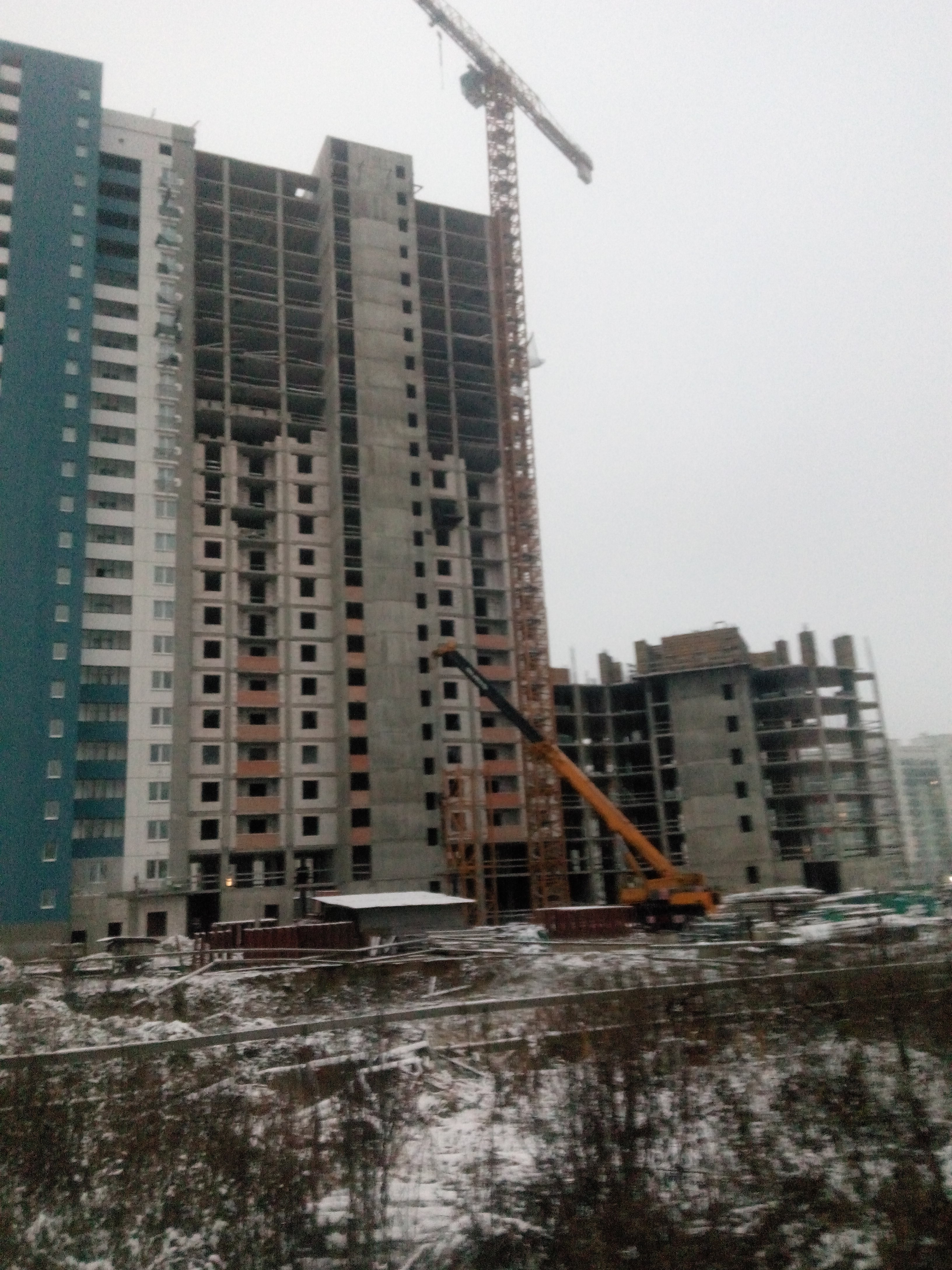
Long term constructed complex "Grushevskij Posad". The third building. Sight from the 2nd Zemlemernaya street

==== Grushevsky Posad ====
Grushevsky Posad was a residential development in Minsk that began construction in 2011. The project operated under VGM Group subsidiary developer, Zhilstroykomplekt LLC. The project experienced repeated delays and received criticism from the public.

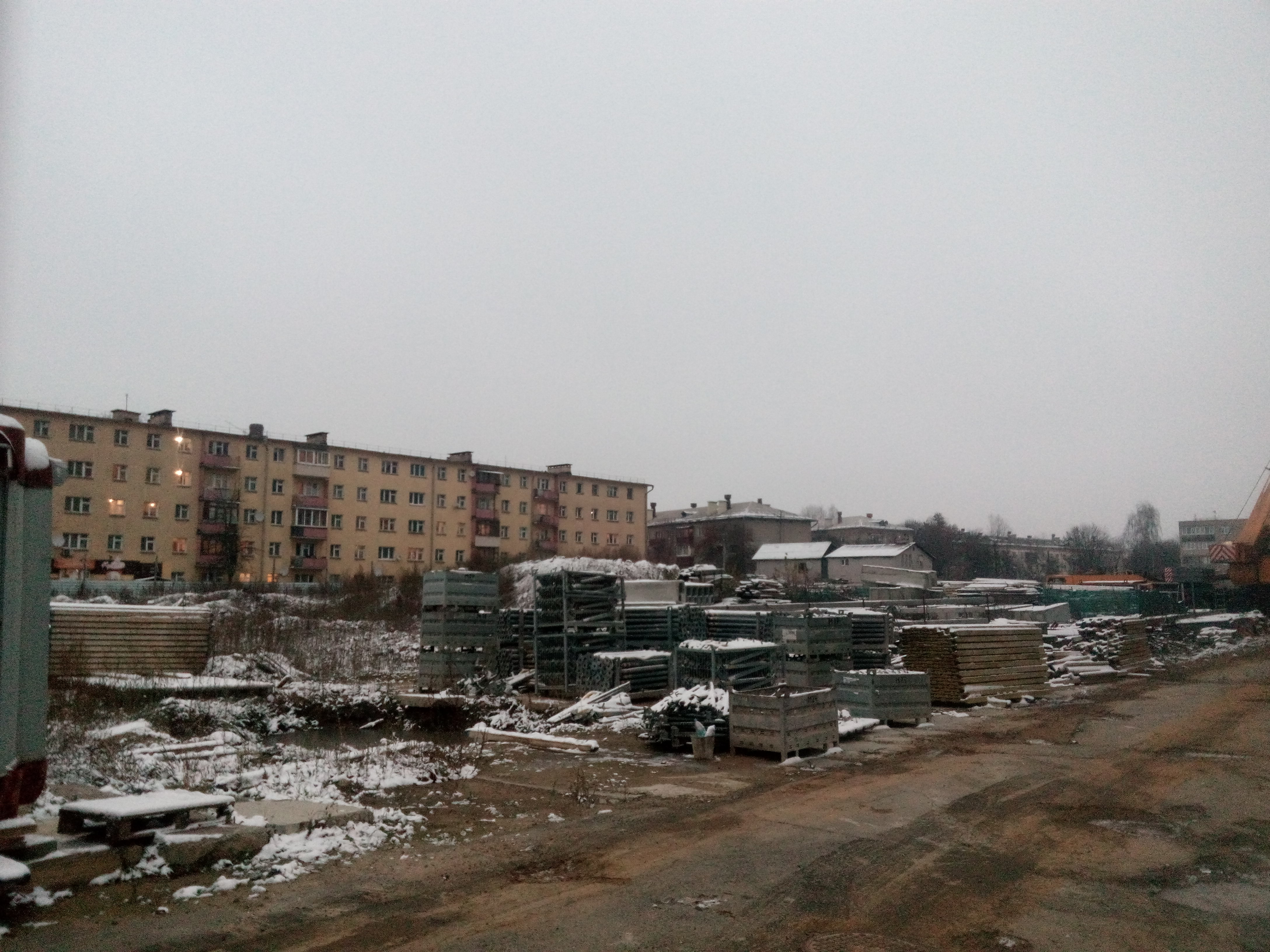
Long term constructed complex "Grushevskij Posad". The fourth building. Sight from the Shchorsa street

==== Trilogia ====
Trilogia is a residential development in Brest. Construction on the project similarly experienced multiple delays and changes in contractors.

==== Karamel ====
Karamel is a residential development in Minsk. Construction delays prompted intervention by local authorities and restructuring of project management.

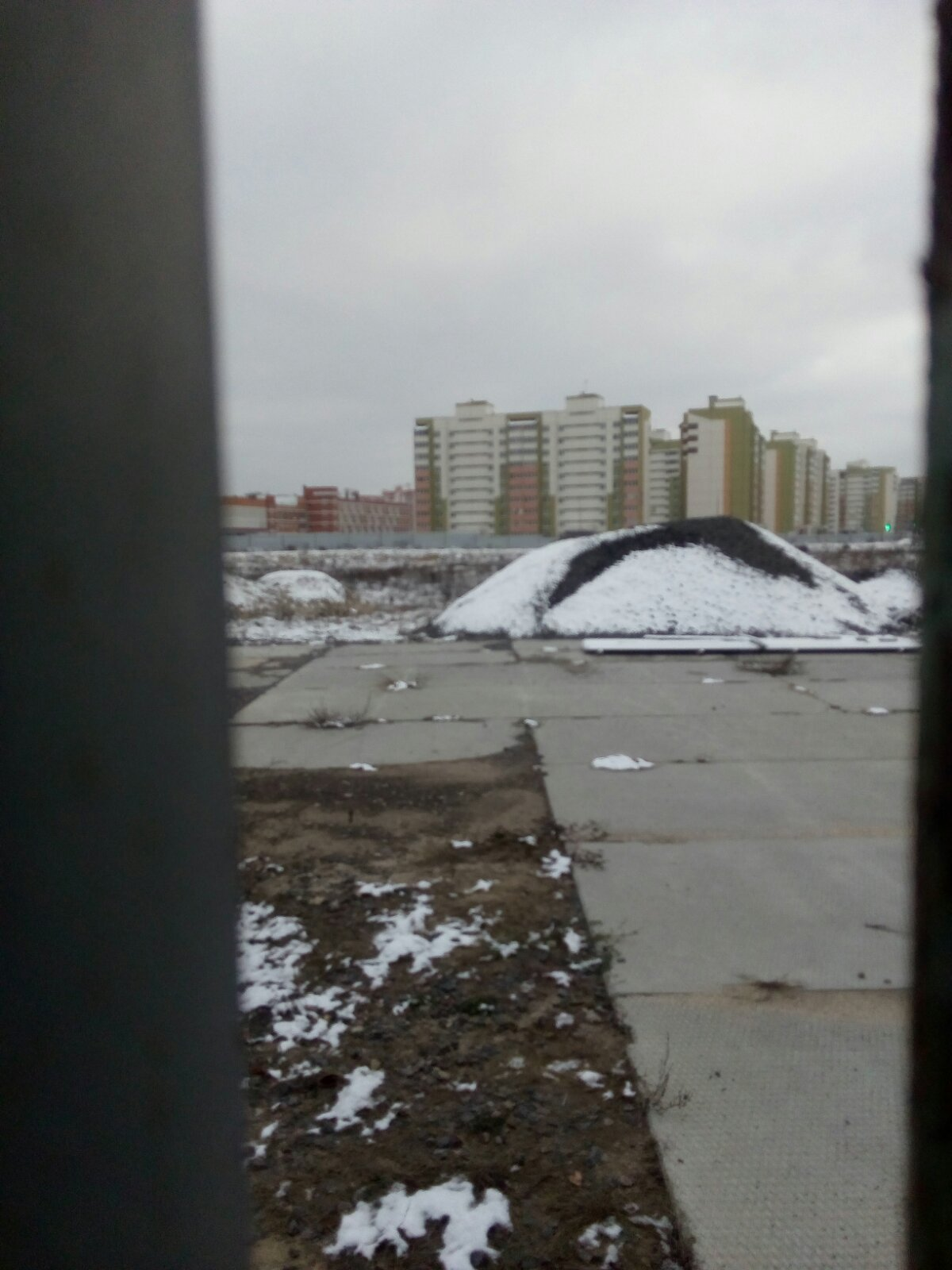
"Vest towers" housing complex

==== Vest Towers ====
Vest Towers is a residential complex in Brest launched in 2019.

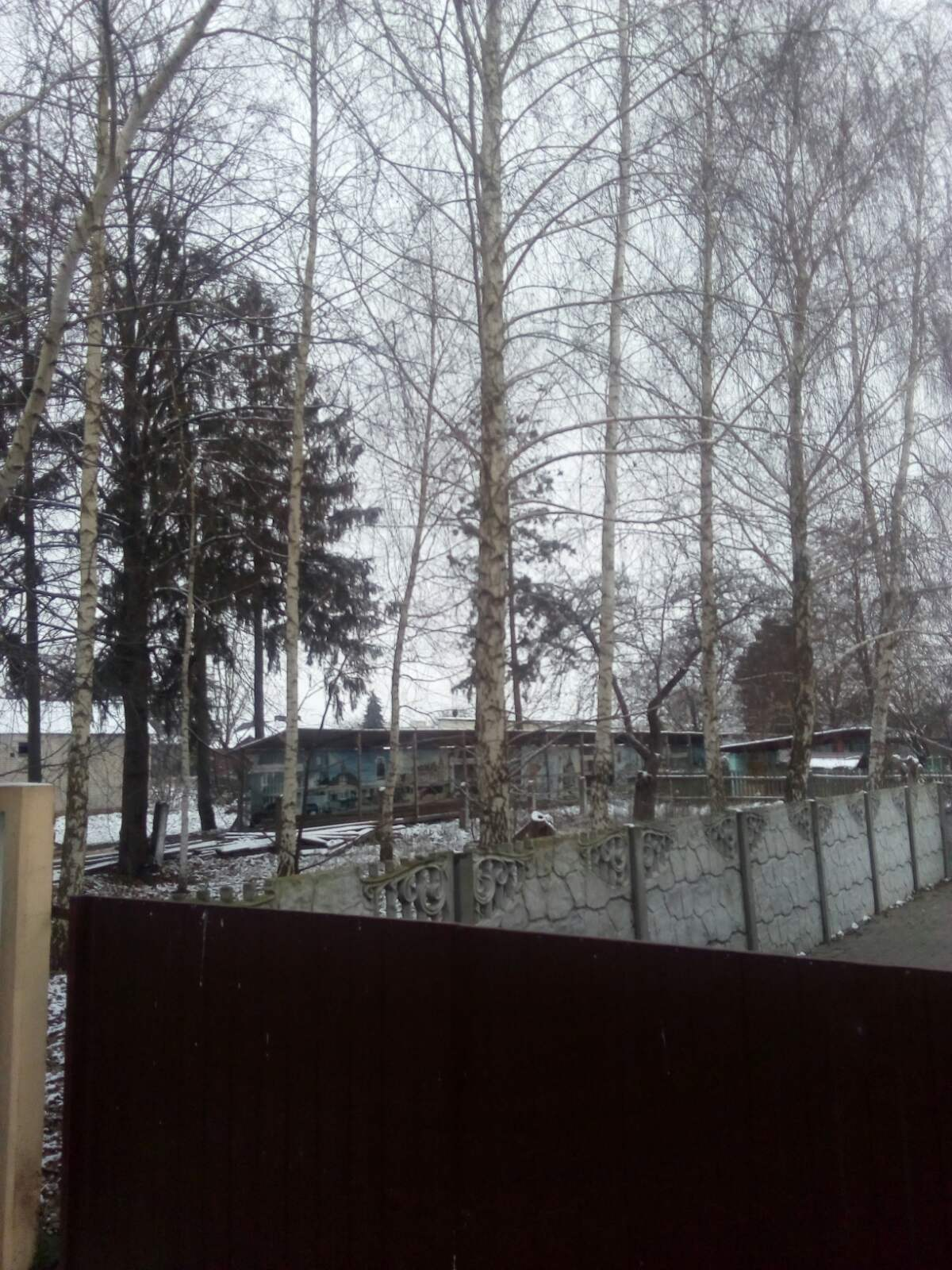
Long term constructed "Park" housing complex

==== Park ====
Park is a residential development announced in Kobryn in 2018.

== Legal issues and controversies ==
VGM Group has been the subject of media criticism regarding construction delays, financing issues, and investigations involving companies associated with the company, particularly the bankruptcy of Zhilstroykomplekt LLC, related entities, and the subsidiary's lack of bond and interest payment.

VGM Group subsidiary companies have been cited for construction code violations. The development company was cited for engaging in construction practices that may have reduced the structural strength of the properties built. The company was also under investigation for fraudulent bankruptcy of construction company.
