= Ryta =

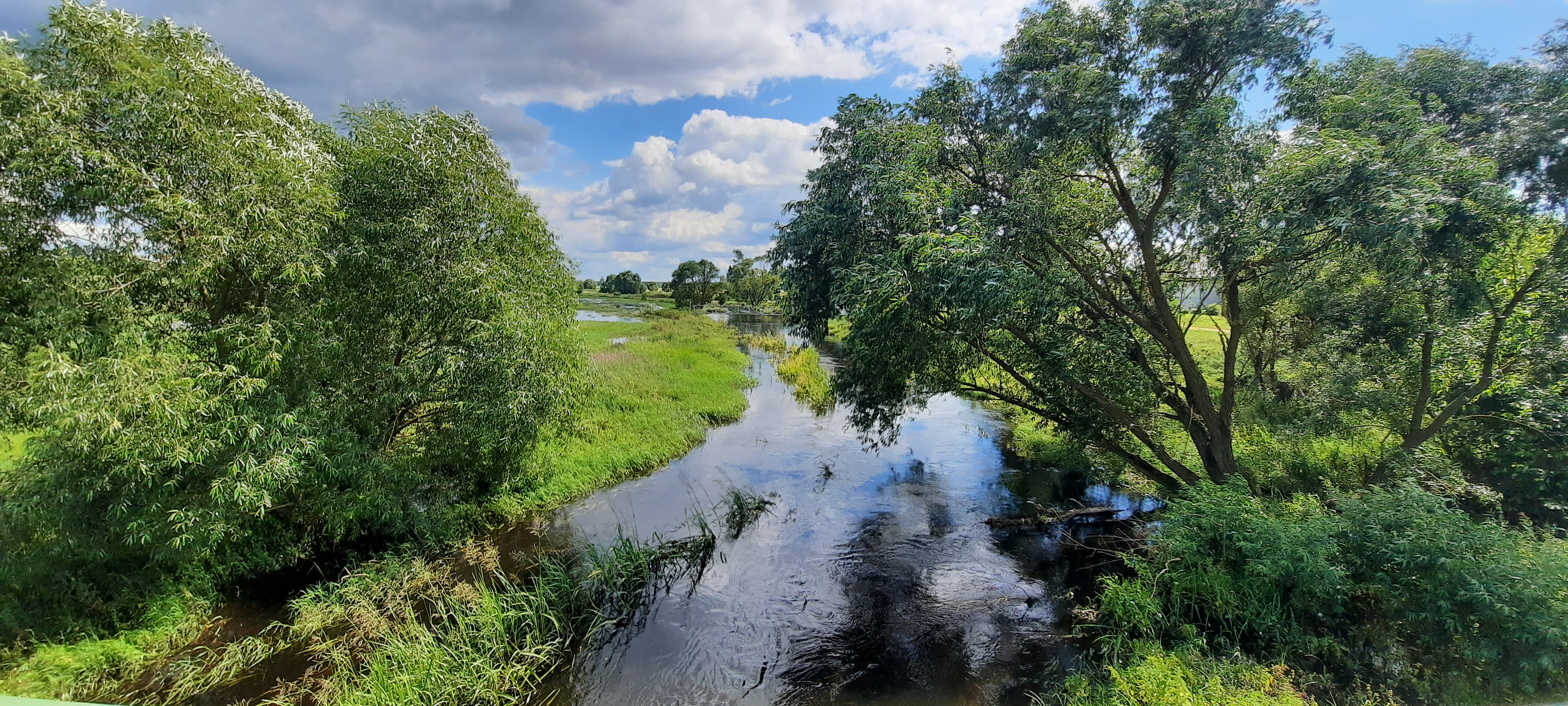
- Native name: Рыта (Belarusian)

Location
- Countries: Ukraine, Belarus

Physical characteristics
- Source: Sushytnitsa
  - coordinates: 51.721°N 24.1475°E
- Mouth: Mukhavets
  - coordinates: 52.0848°N 23.9107°E

Basin features
- Progression: Mukhavets→ Bug→ Narew→ Vistula→ Baltic Sea

The Ryta (Belarusian: Рыта) is a river in Belarus, a left tributary of the Mukhavets.

== Etymology ==
Possible etymology, the name of the river Ryta derived from Lithuanian/Baltic word "rytas", meaning "morning".

Previously, the source of the river was Lake Krymne (51.5724°N 23.9821°E) in the Volyn region of Ukraine; however, after reclamation work, the source of the river is now located at the village of Sushytnitsa. The river flows through the territory of the Malorita, Brest and Zhabinka districts of the Brest region. The length is 62 km, the basin area is 1730 km^{2}. It discharges into the Mukhavets near the village of Lytvyny.

Part of the flow goes to Lukovskoe reservoir. The main tributary is Malorita. A drain of many ameliorative canals also occurs in the river.
