= Stryhanyets =

Village in Brest Region, Belarus

Stryhanyets Стрыганец (Belarusian)
- Village
- Location within Belarus
- Coordinates: 52°6′47″N 24°1′50″E
- Country: Belarus
- Region: Brest Region
- District: Zhabinka District
- Time zone: UTC+3 (MSK)
- Postal code: 225216
- Area code: +375 1641
- License plate: 1

Stryhanyets (Belarusian: Стрыганец, romanized: Stryhaniecs; Russian: Стриганец, romanized: Striganets) is a village in Zhabinka District, Brest Region, in south-western Belarus. Stryhanyets is part of Rakitnitsa selsoviet.

== History ==
In the interwar period, Strychaniec, as it was known in Polish, was administratively located in the Kobryń County in the Polesie Voivodeship of Poland. According to the 1921 census, the settlement had a population of 296, 96.0% Polish and 3.7% Belarusian.

Following the invasion of Poland in September 1939, it was first occupied by the Soviet Union until 1941, then by Nazi Germany until 1944, and then re-occupied by the Soviet Union, which eventually annexed it from Poland in 1945.
