= Konstanty Mackiewicz =

Polish painter

- Born: 2 November 1894; Malaryta, Belarus
- Died: 30 September 1985 (aged 90); Łódź, Poland
- Occupation: Painter

Konstanty Mackiewicz (2 November 1894 – 30 September 1985) was a Polish painter. His work was part of the painting event in the art competition at the 1936 Summer Olympics.
