= Gedaliah Alon =

Israeli historian (1901–1950)

- גדליה אלון
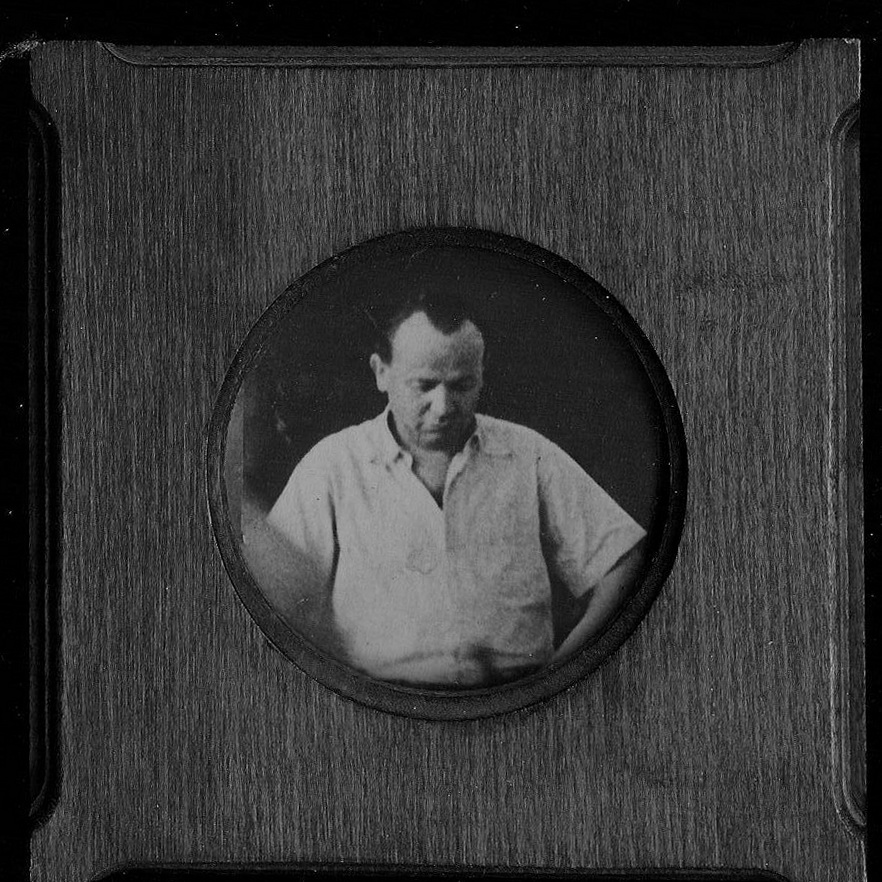
- Mounted portrait of Alon
- Born: Gedaliah Rogozitski; 1901; Kobryn, Grodno Governorate, Russian Empire
- Died: 17 March 1950 (aged 48–49); Jerusalem, Israel
- Citizenship: Israeli
- Education: Yeshivas Knesses Yisrael; Hebrew University of Jerusalem
- Occupation: Historian
- Writing career
- Language: Hebrew
- Notable awards: Israel Prize (1953)

Gedaliah Alon (Hebrew: גדליה אלון), (1901 – 17 March 1950) was an Israeli historian.

== Biography ==
Gedaliah Rogoznitski (later Alon) was born in 1901 in Kobryn, Belarus (then in Russian-ruled Poland). In 1924, he studied for a year at Berlin University and, in 1926, he emigrated to the British Mandate of Palestine and continued his studies at the Hebrew University of Jerusalem. He later joined the faculty of the Hebrew University.

== Awards and recognition ==
In 1953, three years after his death, Alon was posthumously awarded the Israel Prize for Jewish studies, the inaugural year of the prize.

== Published works ==
- Jews, Judaism, and the Classical World: Studies in Jewish History in the Times of the Second Temple and Talmud; translated from the Hebrew by Israel Abrahams, Jerusalem: Magnes Press, the Hebrew University, 1977.
- The Jews in their Land in the Talmudic Age (70-640 C.E.); translated and edited by Gershon Levi, Jerusalem: Magnes Press, the Hebrew University, 1980-1984; Cambridge, Mass.: Harvard University Press, 1989.

== See also ==
- List of Israel Prize recipients
