= Zhabinka =

Town in Brest Region, Belarus

Zhabinka Жабінка (Belarusian)
- Town
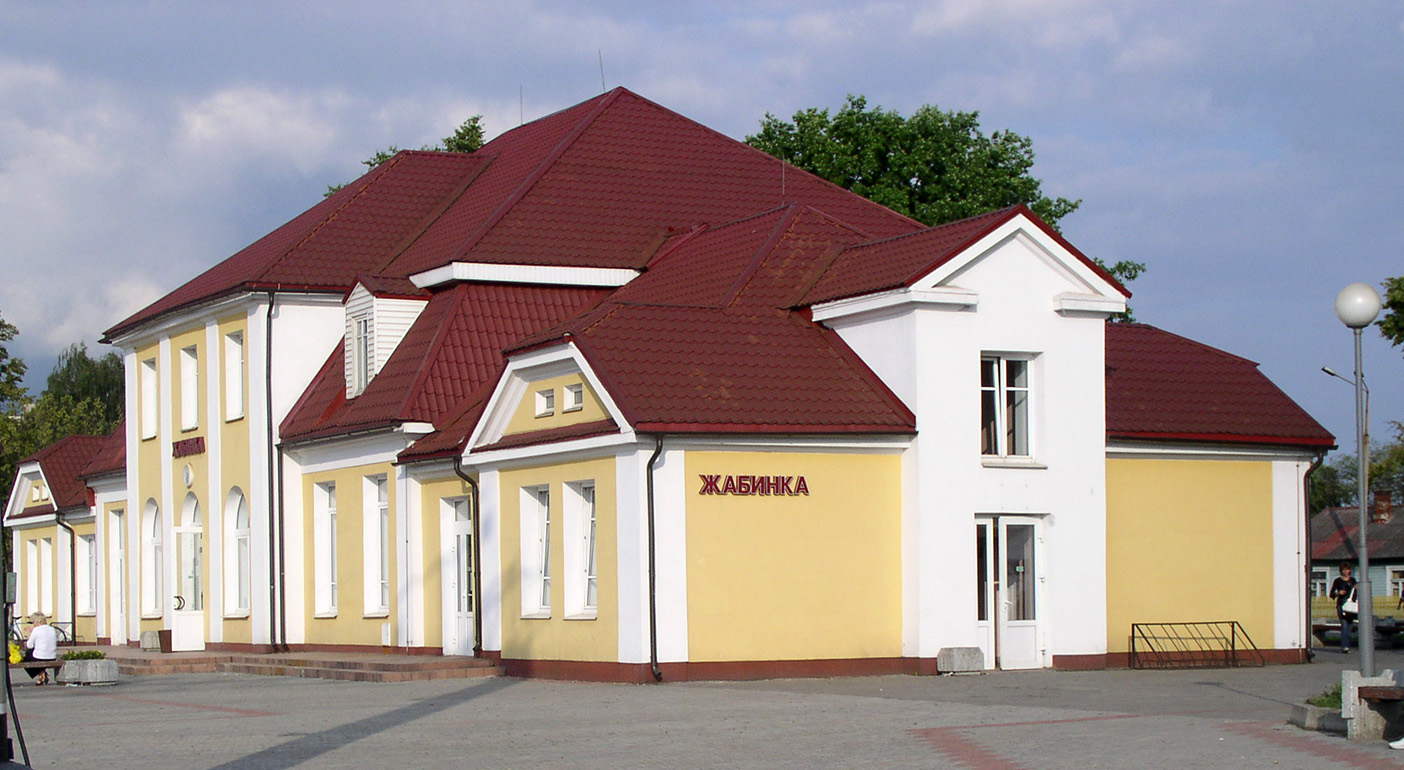
- Zhabinka train station

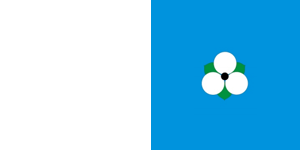
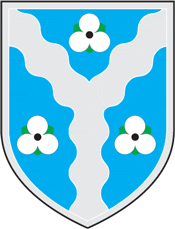
- Flag Coat of arms

- Location within Belarus
- Coordinates: 52°12′02″N 24°01′24″E
- Country: Belarus
- Region: Brest Region
- District: Zhabinka District
- First mentioned: 1817

Population (2026)
  - Total: 14,430
- Time zone: UTC+3 (MSK)
- Postal code: 225101, 225102, 225110
- Area code: +375 1641
- License plate: 1

Zhabinka (Note: Belarusian: Жабінка, romanized: Žabinka, IPA: [ˈʐabʲinka]; locally [ˈʒ⁽ʲ⁾abɪnkɐ]; Yiddish: זשאבינקע, romanized: Zhabinke; Polish: Żabinka.) is a town in Brest Region, in south-western Belarus. It serves as the administrative center of Zhabinka District. As of 2026, it has a population of 14,430.

== Geography ==
Žabinka is located on the Mukhavets River at the confluence of the tiny Zhabinka River, which is considered rather a creek. The town has the biggest in the district water reservoir Vizzhar (25 ha), which is located in the western part of the town.

There is a big square and a park in the center of the town.

The town occupies 9.11 km^{2}.

== History ==
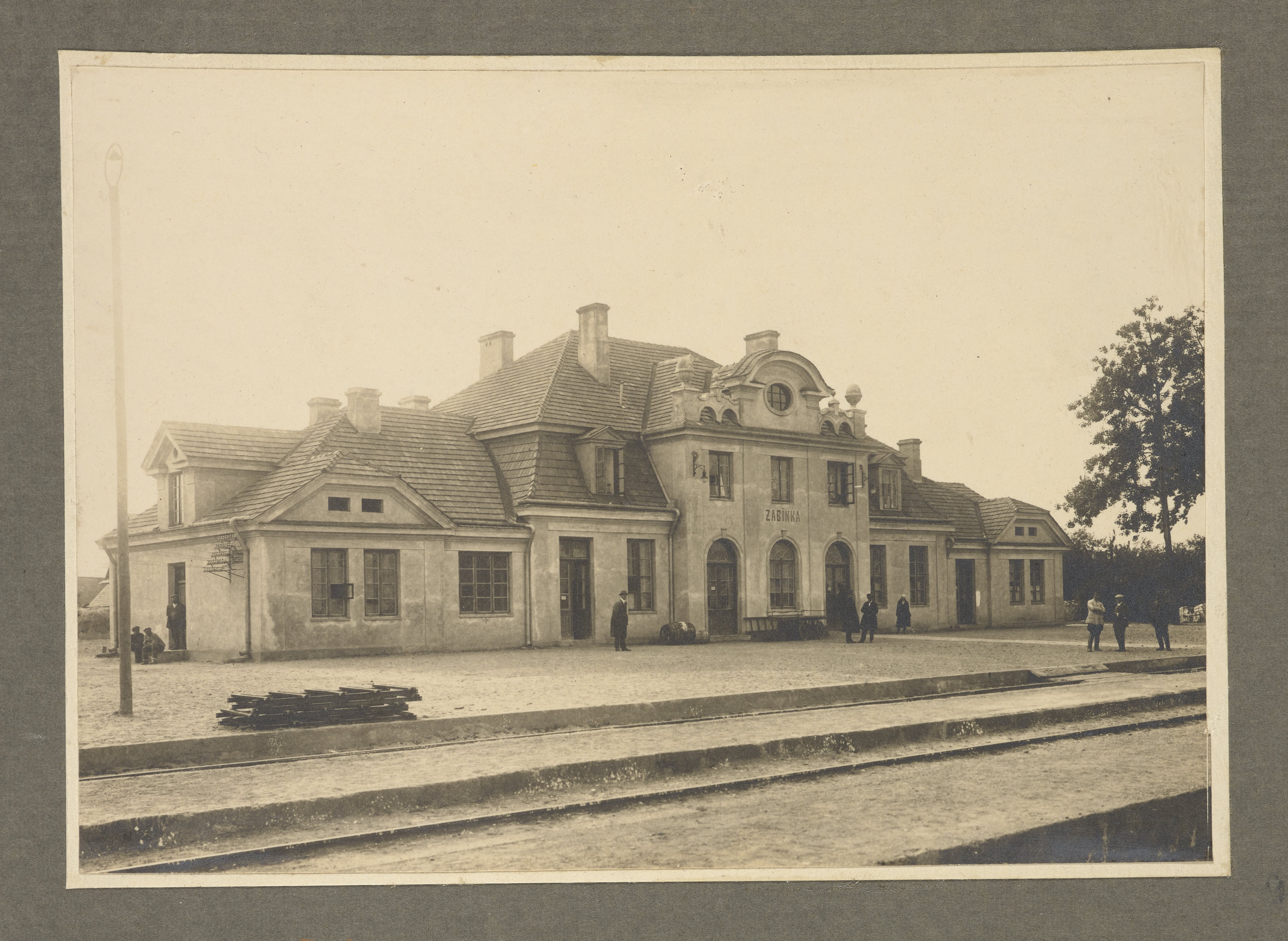
Railway station in 1925

Within the Grand Duchy of Lithuania and Polish–Lithuanian Commonwealth, Zhabinka was a part of Brest Litovsk Voivodeship. In 1795, Zhabinka was acquired by the Russian Empire as a result of the Third Partition of Poland. The name of the place was first mentioned in Russian official papers in 1817.

In 1882, a railway station was built here on the railway line that connected Warsaw, Brest and Moscow. It gave a powerful impetus to the development of the place. Within two decades Zhabinka turned from a village into a town, attracting people of commerce, after the station boosted the economic development of the place. From 1921 until 1939, Zhabinka was part of the Second Polish Republic, administratively in Kobryń County in the Polesie Voivodeship.

On July 30, 1920, the 63rd Infantry Regiment of the Polesie Group of the Polish Army, stationed near Żabinka, engaged with units from the Soviet 10th Rifle Division as part of their withdrawal to the Brest area during the Polish–Soviet War. At Żabinka, the battalions of the 63rd Infantry Regiment achieved a spectacular victory, launching attacks from multiple sides. The Soviet 10th Rifle Division suffered a severe defeat, losing prisoners and 12 machine guns.

During the German-Soviet invasion of Poland, which started World War II in September 1939, the town was occupied by the Red Army and, on 14 November 1939, incorporated into the Byelorussian SSR.

From 23 June 1941 until 21 July 1944, Zhabinka was occupied by Nazi Germany and administered as a part of the Generalbezirk Wolhynien-Podolien of Reichskommissariat Ukraine. The German occupiers established and operated the Zhabinka Ghetto for Jews in the town. In September 1942, the Polish resistance blew up the railway tracks to disrupt a German military transport.

For 125 years, the town has been sprawling along the road from the railway station southwards to the highway Brest-Moscow, that is the major transcontinental traffic artery E30 today. After World War II a big sugar refinery was built north of the railway line. A big settlement appeared around it.

Today Kirov Street starts form the railway station, runs across the town center with a big square and a park, further on southwards to the highway.

== Notable people ==
In 2004, a Polish woman named Floria Budziszewska, who risked her life to save two Jewish children in Zhabinka, was posthumously awarded the Righteous Among Nations title.
