= Independent Operational Group Polesie =

Part of the Polish Army in the Second World War

Independent Operational Group Polesie (Samodzielna Grupa Operacyjna Polesie, SGO Polesie) was one of the Polish Army Corps (Operational Groups) that defended Poland during the Invasion of Poland in 1939. It was created on 11 September 1939 and was commanded by general Franciszek Kleeberg. The SGO is most notable for fighting in the battle of Kock, the last battle of the Invasion of Poland.

== Tasks ==
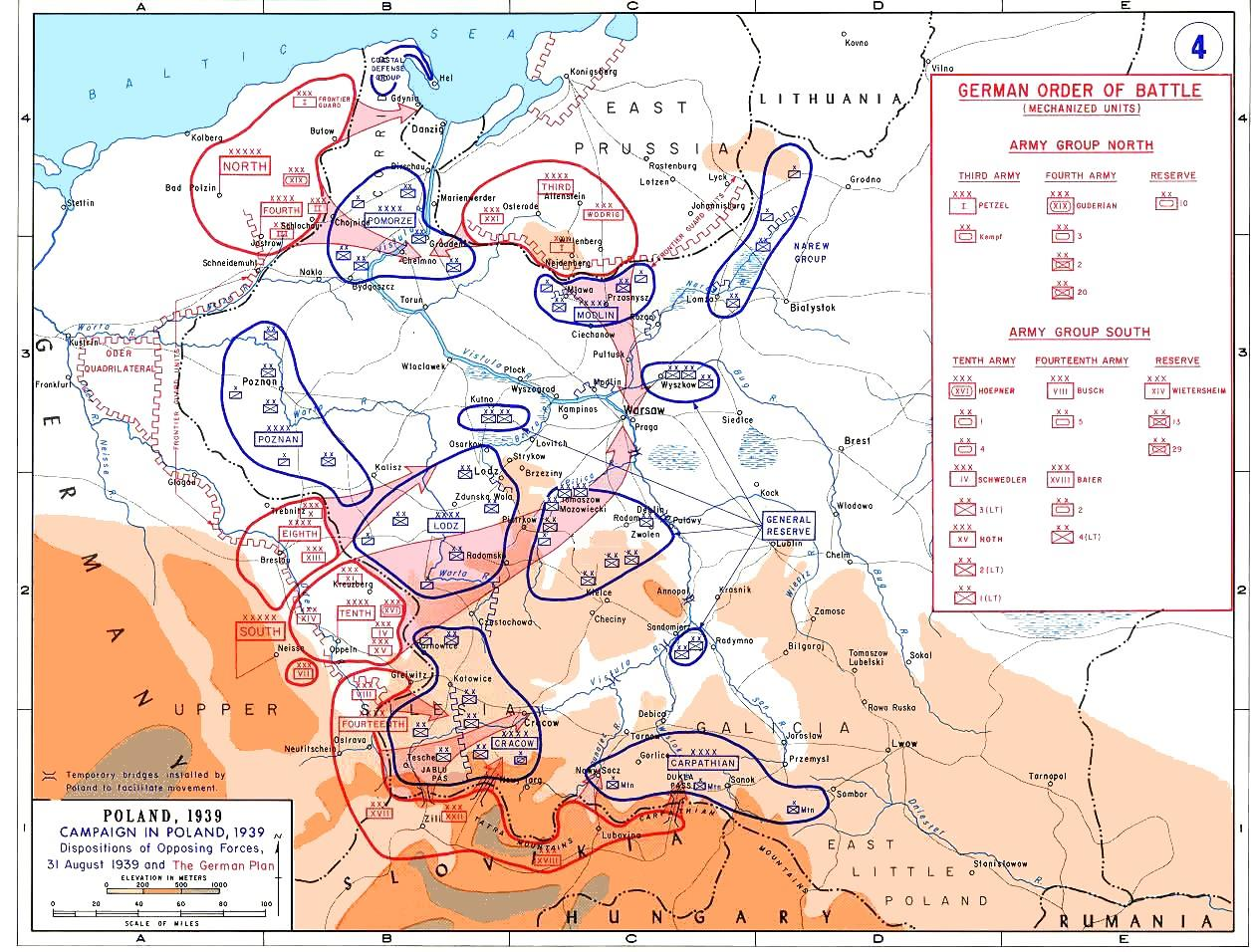
Forces as of 31 August and German plan of attack.

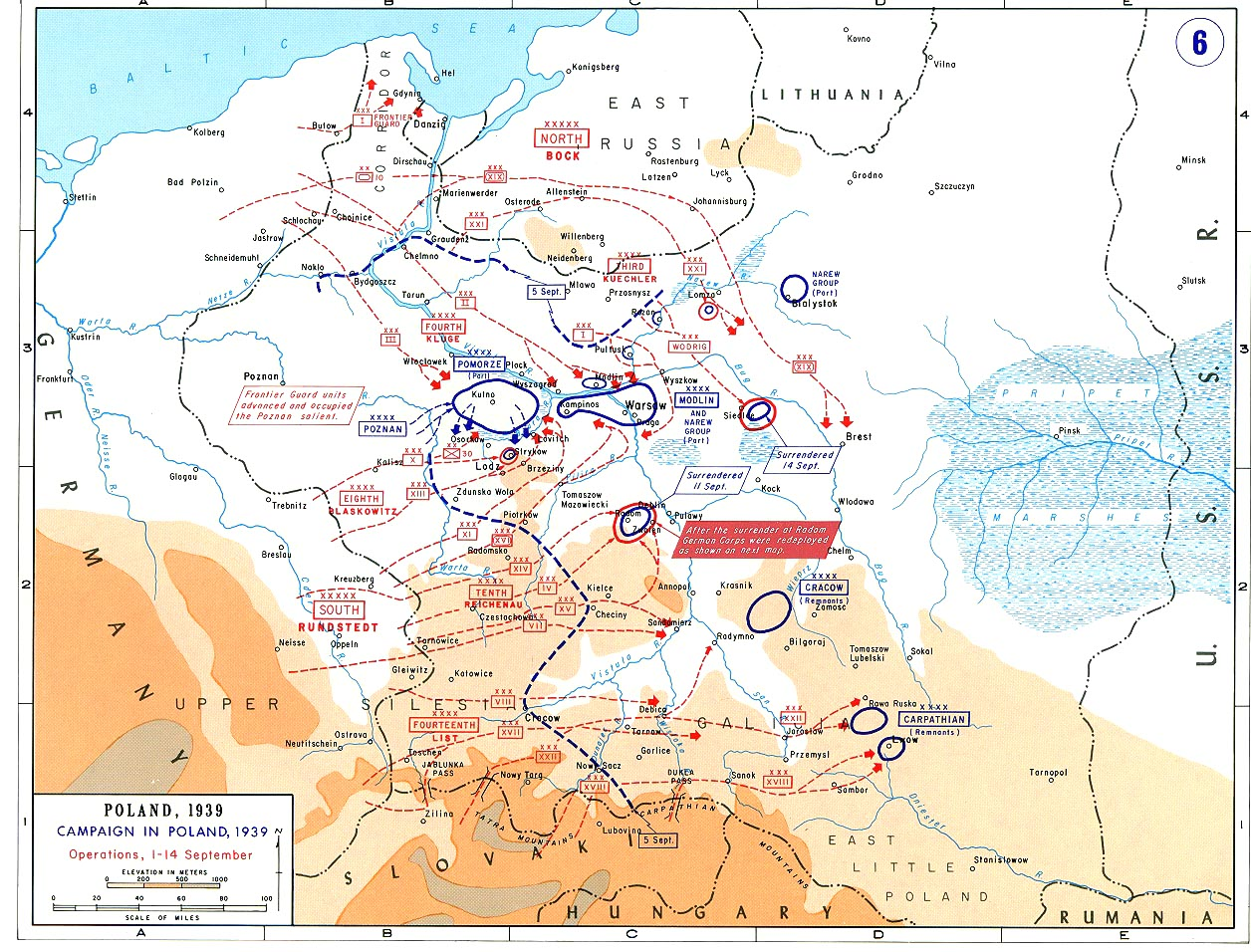
Forces as of 14 September with troop movements up to this date.

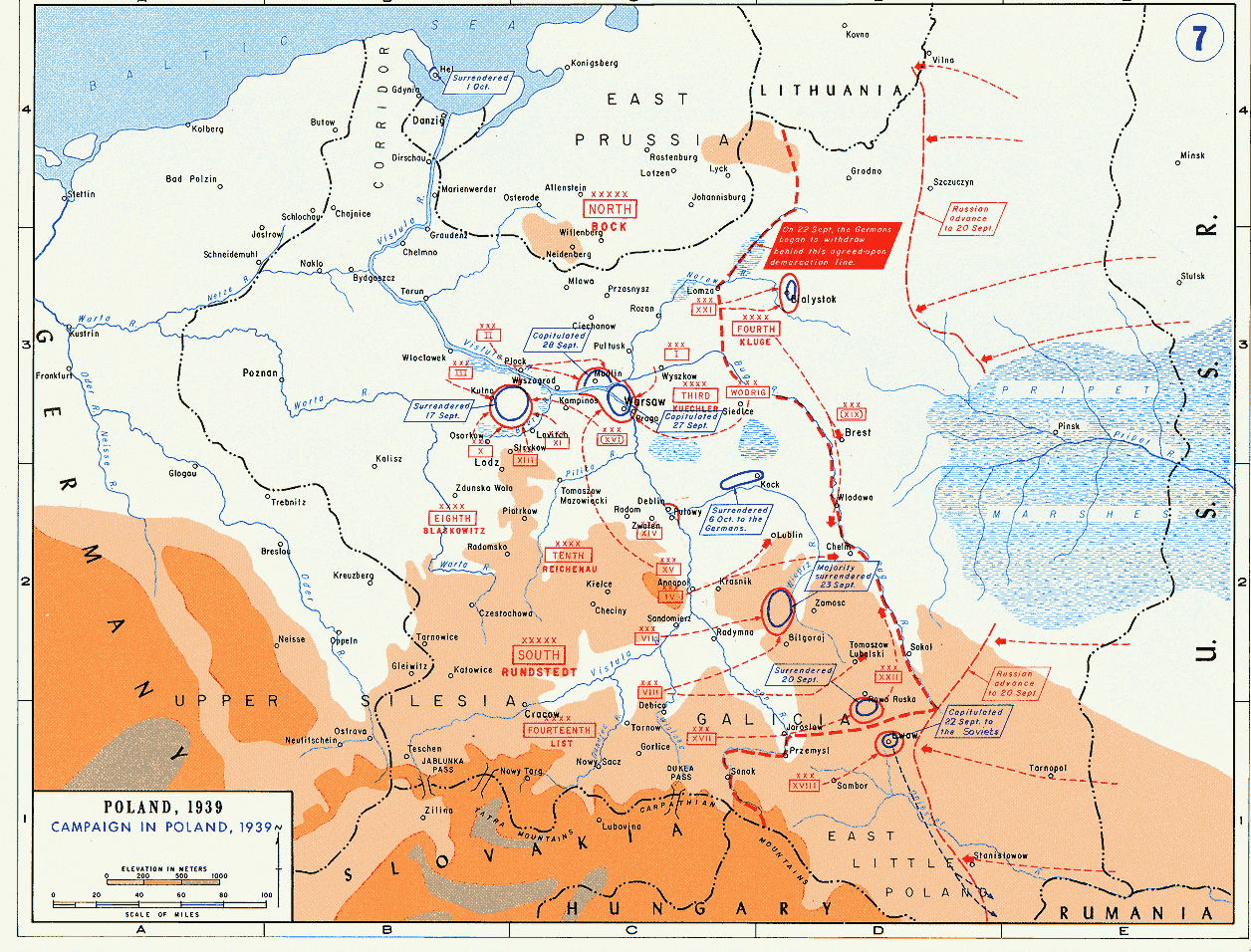
Forces after 14 September with troop movements after this date; note Polesie Group near Kock

The SGO was created on the orders of the Polish Commander in Chief on 9 and 11 September due to German breakthroughs and was tasked with defending the region of Polesie (see also Polesie Voivodeship), defined by the lines of Muchawiec and Prypeć rivers, with the towns of Brześć (Brest) and Pińsk (where the SGO HQ was located). The SGO was to prevent Polish forces in central Poland from being encircled from the east.

== Operational history ==
From 14 September the units of the SGO faced the German XIX Panzer Corps under Heinz Guderian. The forces under general Konstanty Plisowski defended the town of Brześć (Brest) from 16 to 19 September while the forces under colonel Adam Epler defended Kobryń from 16 to 18 September.

After the Soviet invasion of Poland on September 17, Kleeberg at first followed orders from Polish High Command and retreated towards the Romanian border (see Romanian Bridgehead). On 22 September, cut off from his superiors, he decided to aid besieged Warsaw. As they were running low on supplies, Kleeberg decided to recapture the town of Dęblin, where the Polish Army had large stores of supplies. On 28 September Warsaw capitulated; Kleeberg - at that time having crossed the Bug river near Włodawa - decided that the units would advance west and organize large scale partisan warfare from local forest complexes near Świętokrzyskie Mountains. In the days of 29–30 September the units were engaged by the Soviet Red Army but were able to defeat them. From 2 October the SGO, at that point the last organized regular unit of the Polish Army, fought against the German forces of XIV Mechanized Corps in the battle of Kock. Despite immense German numerical superiority, the Polish forces were able to score several tactical victories; however they were increasingly running low on supplies, including ammunition. Hence on 5 October Kleeberg decided to capitulate; the fighting ended in the early hours of October 6. He was the last Polish general to capitulate in the Polish Defensive War; he is also considered one of the few Polish generals of the September 1939 campaign to have not been defeated in battle (along with Gen. Maczek).^{[a]}

Not all of the Polesie Group soldiers capitulated; many dispersed and continued guerrilla warfare, most notably major Henryk Dobrzański and his Detached Unit of the Polish Army, which is credited with being the first Polish partisan unit and was active until the spring of 1940.

== Organization ==
The SGO was commanded by general Franciszek Kleeberg, his chief of staff was colonel M. Łapicki. Kleeberg was tasked with organizing his group from various small units in the Polesie region; most of them were either reserve and mobilizing or second line such as the National Defense units; the notable exception were the elite Border Protection Corps (KOP) units and the Riverine Flotilla of the Polish Navy.

On 14 September, when the group was engaged by German forces, it was composed of:

- "Kobryń Group" (seven infantry battalions) - under col. Adam Epler
- "Brześć Group" (five infantry battalions, two light tank companies, two armored trains under gen. Konstanty Plisowski
- "Drohiczyn Poleski Group" (three infantry battalions) - under col. Kazimierz Gorzkowski
- "Jasiołda Group" (one infantry battalion) - under mjr Ludwik Rau
- Riverine Flotilla of the Polish Navy

Over the next two weeks the group sustained casualties but it was also reinforced by various units from the disintegrating Polish army, including defenders of the Sarny Fortified Area. The total strength of the SGO was 18,000 soldiers.

On 29 September, after reorganization, the group was composed of:

- Polish 50th Infantry Division (reserve, later nicknamed "Brzoza" after its commander) under col. Ottokar Brzoza-Brzezina
- Polish 60th Infantry Division (reserve, later nicknamed "Kobryń") under col. Adam Epler
- Improvised Cavalry Division "Zaza" (pl) (improvised, nicknamed "Zaza") under gen. Zygmunt Podhorski (mostly based on Podlaska Cavalry Brigade and Suwalska Cavalry Brigade from Independent Operational Group Narew)

== Notes ==
A Stanisław Maczek, another Polish commander with the reputation of being undefeated, was promoted from colonel to general in November 1939 after his 10. Cavalry Brigade AKA "Die Schwarze Brigade" – "The Black Brigade", a fully motorized and mechanized unit, outperformed any other such unit (including tank brigades) in the Polish military. The unit was recreated in France in 1940 and fought in 1944 and 1945 alongside the British (Polish Armed Forces in the West).
