= Malaryta =

Town in Brest Region, Belarus

Malaryta Маларыта (Belarusian)
- Town
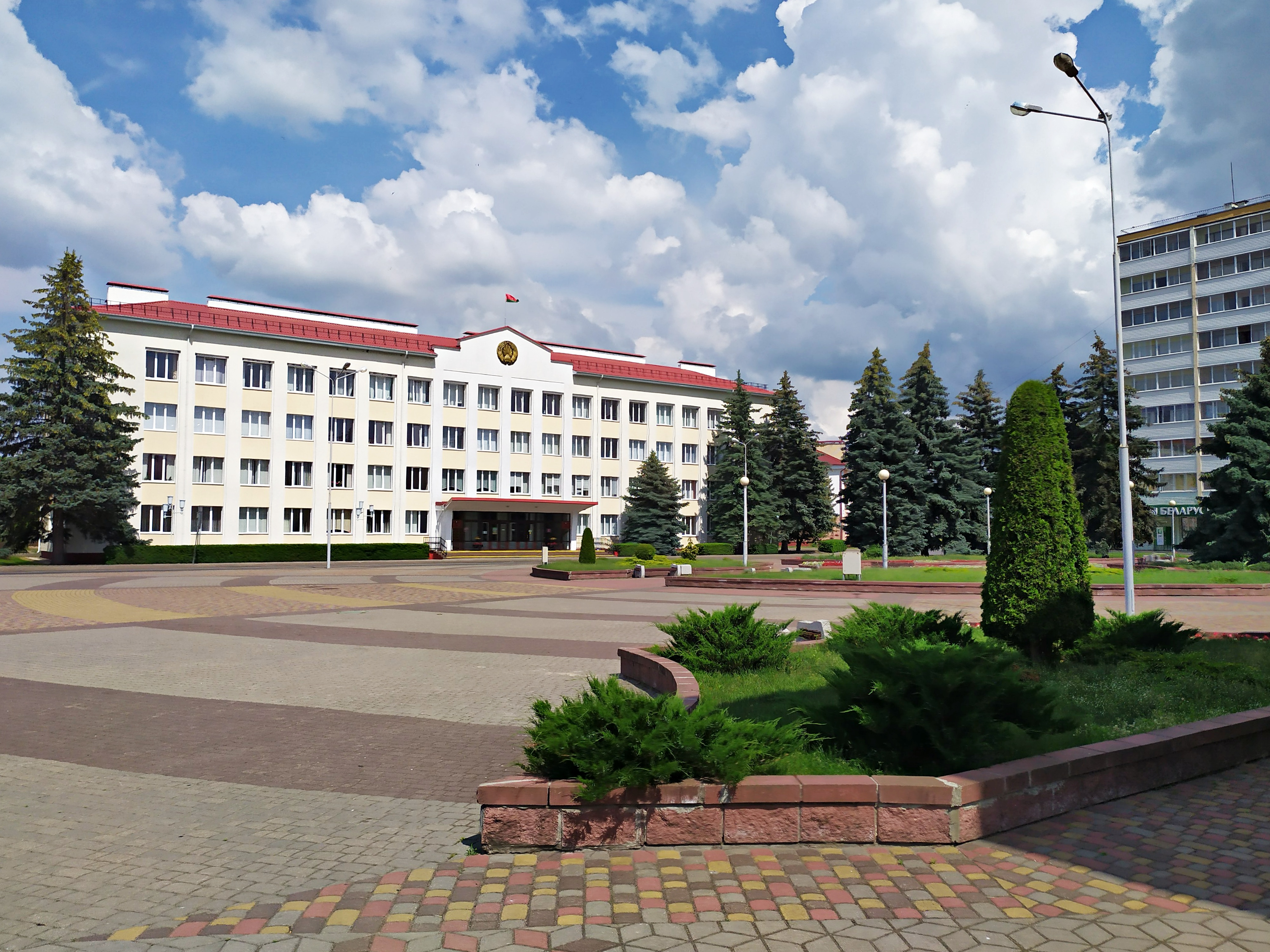

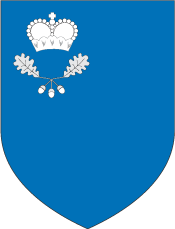
- Coat of arms
- Interactive map of Malaryta
- Location within Belarus
- Coordinates: 51°47′N 24°05′E
- Country: Belarus
- Region: Brest Region
- District: Malaryta District
- First mentioned: 1566

Population (2026)
  - Total: 12,593
- Time zone: UTC+3 (MSK)
- Postal code: 225910
- Area code: +375 1651
- License plate: 1

Malaryta or Malorita (Note: Belarusian: Малары́та, Belarusian pronunciation: [malaˈrɨta]; Russian and Ukrainian: Малори́та, Russian pronunciation: [mɐlɐˈrʲitɐ], Ukrainian pronunciation: [mɐloˈrɪtɐ]; Polish: Małoryta; Yiddish: מאַלעריטע) is a town in Brest Region, in south-western Belarus. It serves as the administrative centre of Malaryta District. The name of the city comes from the Ryta River. As of 2026, it has a population of 12,593.

== History ==
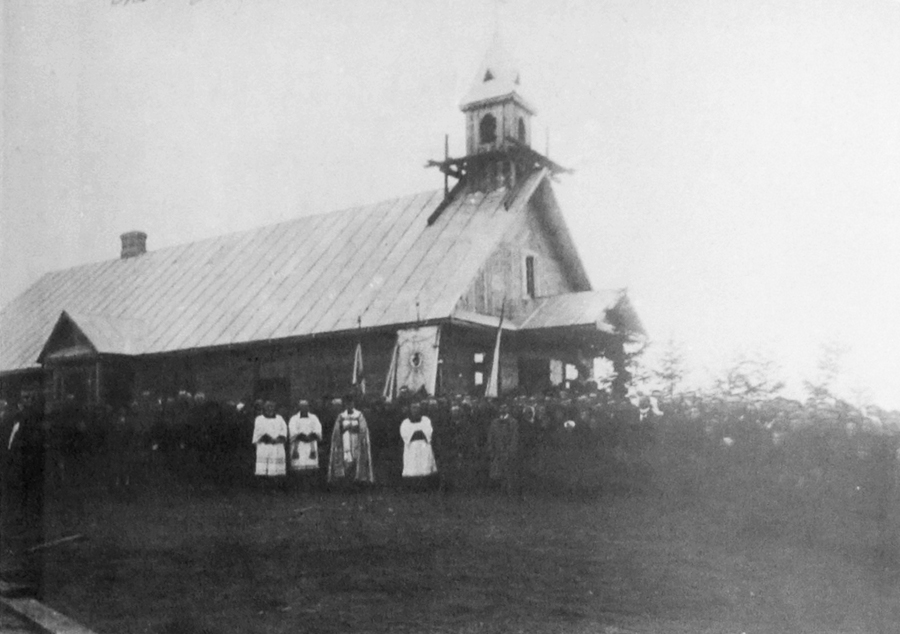
Local Catholic church in 1924

Within the Grand Duchy of Lithuania and Polish–Lithuanian Commonwealth, Malaryta was part of Brest Litovsk Voivodeship. In 1795, Malaryta was acquired by the Russian Empire as a result of the Third Partition of Poland.

From 1921 to 1939, Malaryta (Małoryta) was part of the Second Polish Republic, administratively located in the Polesie Voivodeship.

During the German-Soviet invasion of Poland, which started World War II in September 1939, the town was occupied by the Red Army and, on 14 November 1939, incorporated into the Byelorussian SSR. From 22 June 1941 to 20 July 1944, Malaryta was occupied by Nazi Germany and administered as a part of the Generalbezirk Wolhynien-Podolien of Reichskommissariat Ukraine. The Polish resistance was active in the town and its environs. In July 1942, the Polish resistance assassinated the local German Landrat and a Wehrmacht captain and blew up and derailed a German military transport.

== Notable people ==
- Konstanty Mackiewicz (1894–1985), Polish painter
- Leonid Taranenko (born 1956), former weightlifter
- Vadim Skripchenko (born 1975), football coach and former player
- Barys Pukhouski (born 1987), handball player
