= Malaryta district =

District of Brest region, Belarus

Malaryta district Маларыцкі раён (Belarusian)
- District
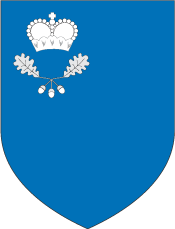
- Coat of arms

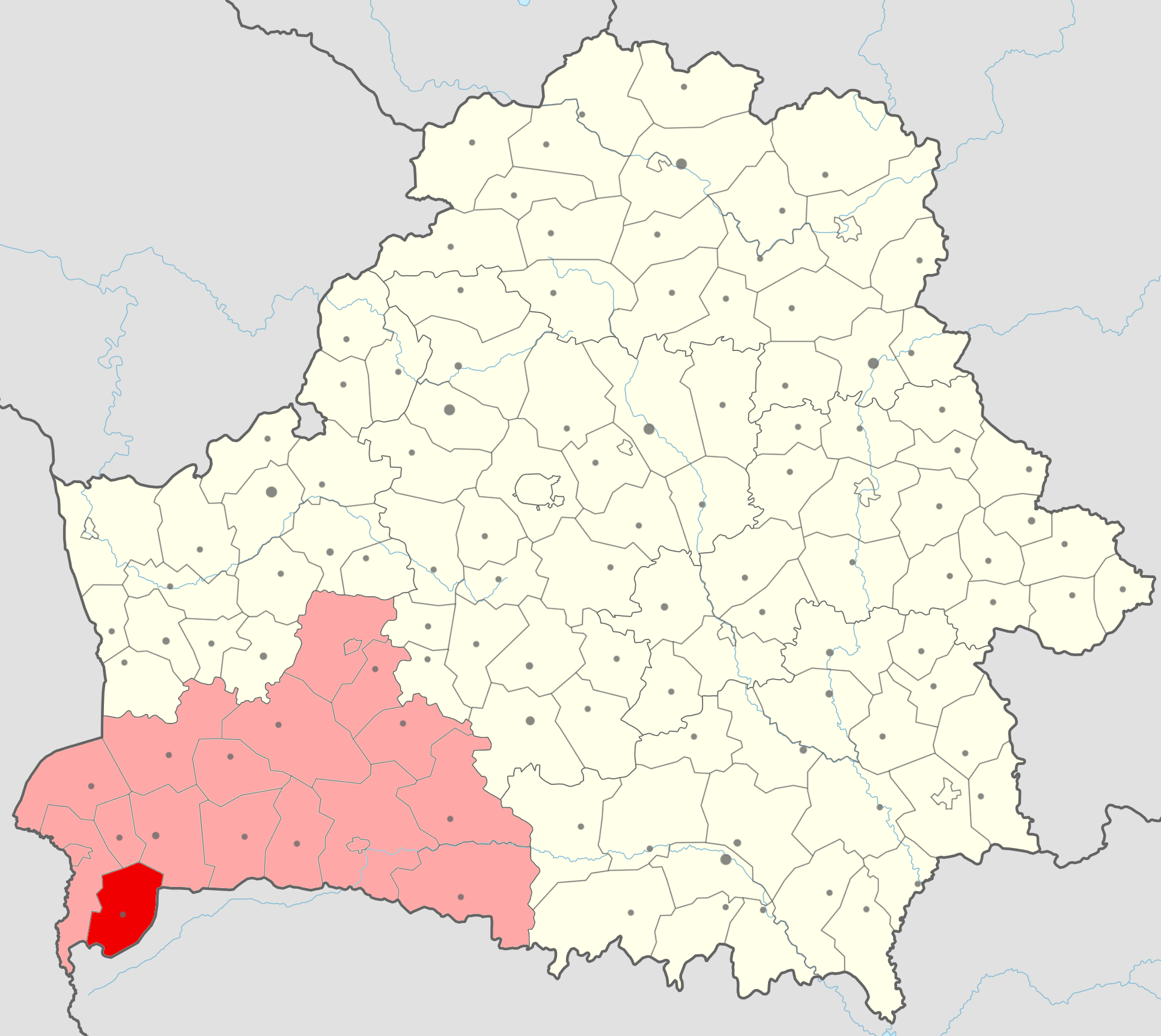
- Coordinates: 51°47′36″N 24°04′13″E
- Country: Belarus
- Region: Brest region
- Administrative center: Malaryta

Government
  - Chairman: Roman Zhuk

Area
  - District: 1,373 km^{2} (530 sq mi)

Population (2024)
  - District: 22,614
  - Density: 16.47/km^{2} (42.66/sq mi)
  - Urban: 12,735
  - Rural: 9,879
- Time zone: UTC+3 (MSK)
- Website: malorita.brest-region.gov.by

Malaryta district (Belarusian: Маларыцкі раён; Russian: Малоритский район) is a district (raion) of Brest region in Belarus. Its administrative center is Malaryta. As of 2024, it has a population of 22,614.

== Demographics ==
According to the 2009 Belarusian census, Malaryta district had a population of 25,780; 88.3% identified themselves as Belarusian, 7.2% as Ukrainian and 3.7% as Russian; 56.6% spoke Belarusian and 38.1% Russian as their native language. In 2023, it had a population of 22,979.
