= Lyeninski, Brest region =

Lyeninski Ленінскі (Belarusian)
- Agrotown
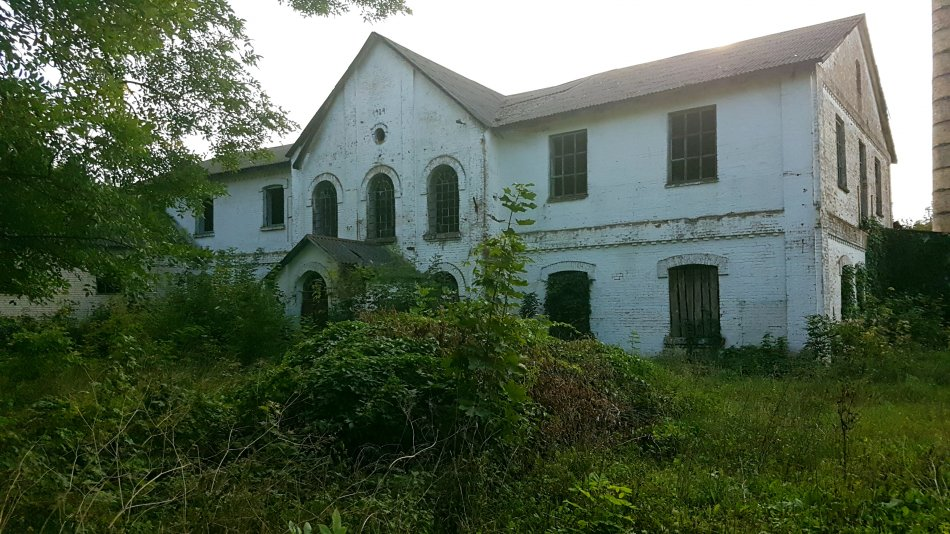
- Former brewery

- Location within Belarus
- Coordinates: 52°09′55.64″N 24°06′31.10″E
- Country: Belarus
- Region: Brest Region
- District: Zhabinka District
- First mentioned: 17th century
- Time zone: UTC+3 (MSK)
- Postal code: 225111
- Area code: +375 (0)1641
- License plate: 1

Lyeninski (Belarusian: Ленінскі, romanized: Lieninski; Russian: Ленинский, romanized: Leninsky; Polish: Ateczyzna) is an agrotown in Zhabinka District, Brest Region, in south-western Belarus. It serves as the administrative center of Leninski rural council (selsoviet). It is located close to the border with Poland.

== History ==
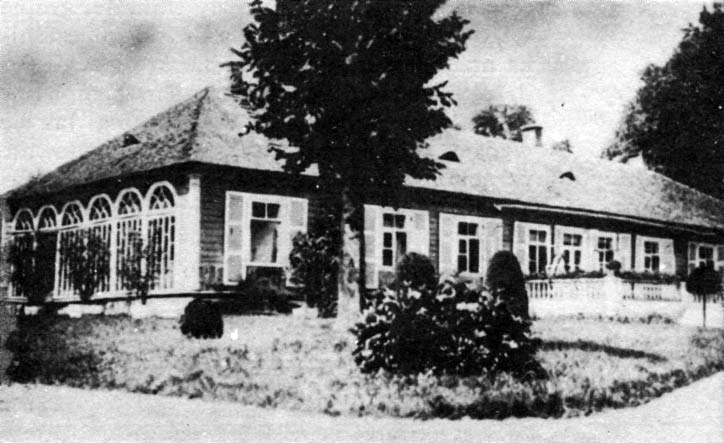
Local manor in the interwar period

In the interwar period, Ateczyzna, as it was known in Polish, was administratively located in the Kobryń County in the Polesie Voivodeship of Poland. According to the 1921 census, the settlement had a population of 118, 45.8% Polish, 44.9% Belarusian and 9.3% Jewish.

Following the invasion of Poland in September 1939, it was first occupied by the Soviet Union until 1941, then by Nazi Germany until 1944, and then re-occupied by the Soviet Union, which eventually annexed it from Poland in 1945.
