= Adam Epler =

Polish Army Colonel then promoted to General brygady

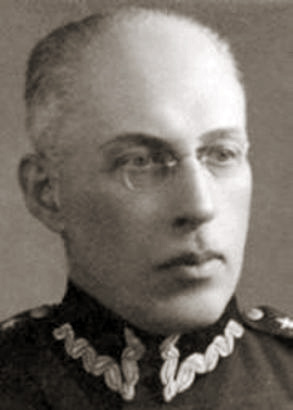
- Colonel Adam Epler
- Born: 1 December 1891; Lviv, Austria-Hungary
- Died: 24 October 1965 (aged 73); London, England
- Military career
- Allegiance: Austria-Hungary; Poland
- Branch: Austro-Hungarian Army; Polish Army
- Service years: 1914–1921; 1923–1949
- Rank: Generał brygady (Brigadier general)
- Units: 20th Infantry Division; 60th Infantry Division
- Commands: Commander of the Infantry in 20th Infantry Division
- Conflicts: World War I Polish–Soviet War; World War II
- Awards

Adam Józef Aleksander Epler (December 1891 in Lwów, Austrian Galicia – 24 October 1965 in London) was a Colonel of Artillery of the Polish Army, posthumously promoted to Generał brygady. Epler had a wife Zofia (née Murczyńska) and son Zbigniew (1919 – 2010).

== Biography ==
Epler was raised in an affluent family: his father Edward was a railroad engineer and deputy mayor of the city of Lwów. In 1909, he graduated from Classical Gymnasium in Chyrów, and began studies at Lwów University. In 1912, Epler was drafted into the Austro-Hungarian Army, serving at XI Artillery Brigade, and graduating from School of Reserve Officers. On 1 May 1915 he was promoted to Subcolonel (podporucznik). During World War I, he fought on the Italian Front, and in 1918, he completed artillery course for officers, which took place at Trento.

After the collapse of Austria-Hungary, Epler returned to former Austrian Galicia and joined the newly created Polish Army. In mid-November 1918, he was named commandant of an artillery battery of 1st Kraków Field Artillery Regiment. Together with the regiment, he fought in the Polish–Ukrainian War and Polish–Soviet War. In 1920, he was transferred to 3rd Legion Field Artillery Regiment.

After the Polish–Soviet War, Epler completed a military training course in Toruń, and was promoted to major. In 1922–1929, he served as artillery officer in the garrison of Zamość, where 3rd Legions Infantry Division was stationed. He was highly praised by General Stanisław Kwaśniewski, who at that time commanded the 3rd Division.

On 4 December 1929 Epler was named commandant of 28th Field Artillery Regiment, which was stationed in Zajezierze near Dęblin. He remained there until October 1935, and during his service at Zajezierze, he was popular among soldiers due to his organizational abilities. From October 1935 until the Invasion of Poland, Epler served in 20th Infantry Division in Baranowicze.

In early September 1939, Epler took command of Reserve Center of 20th Infantry at Słonim. In a matter of a few days, he managed to create the so-called Kobryń Group, with the strength of a regular infantry division. His unit, renamed into 60th Infantry Division, joined Independent Operational Group Polesie (General Franciszek Kleeberg), and fought in the final battles of the September Campaign, including Battle of Kock (1939).

On 6 October 1939 Epler was taken prisoner by the Germans, who allowed him to keep his officer's sabre. He was taken to a temporary camp at Dęblin, and then transferred to Radom. With help of local boy scouts, Epler managed to escape, and fled to Kraków, where he joined conspiratorial Organization of White Eagle, using the pseudonym Kobylański. To escape arrest, he decided to flee to Hungary. In December 1940 he reached Egypt, and after the war settled in London, where he died on 24 October 1965.

Epler wrote the book Last Polish soldier of the 1939 campaign. It was published first in 1942 in Tel Aviv, and reprinted in Poland in 1989. On 28 October 1994 President Lech Wałęsa posthumously promoted him to Generał brygady.

== Awards and decorations ==
- Knight's Cross of Virtuti Militari (posthumously, 1970)
- Gold Cross of Virtuti Militari
- Silver Cross of Virtuti Militari (1921)
- Officer's Cross of the Order of Polonia Restituta (10 November 1928)
- Cross of Valour (four times)
- Gold Cross of Merit (10 November 1938)
- Medal of the 10th Anniversary of the War of Independence (Latvija)

== See also ==
- List of Polish generals

== Sources ==
- Tadeusz Jurga: Obrona Polski 1939. Warszawa: Instytut Wydawniczy PAX, 1990, s. 765. ISBN 83-211-1096-7.
