= Vyets (canal) =

Canal

- The creek.

Details
- Location: Belarus
- Length: 14 km
- No. of terminals: 1

Вец (English: Vyets, or Vets), is a small canal that flows through Pruzhany District. The canal is 14 kilometres (8.7 mi) long and flows into Mukha River.

== Bibliography ==
- Blue Book of Belarus : Encyclopedia / editors: N. A. Disko et al. - Minsk:
- BelEn, 1994. - 415 p. - 10,000 copies. - ISBN 5-85700-133-1.Republic of Belarus. Brest region. Pruzhany district: map. Pruzhany: plan.Ruzhany: plan. Shereshevo: plan / Ed. V.A. Zmachinskaya .. - Minsk: RUE"Belkartography", 2008. - 3 000 copies.
