= Zhabinka district =

District of Brest region, Belarus

Zhabinka district Жабінкаўскі раён (Belarusian) Жабинковский район (Russian)
- District
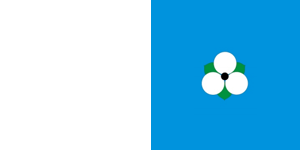
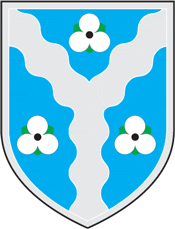
- Flag Coat of arms

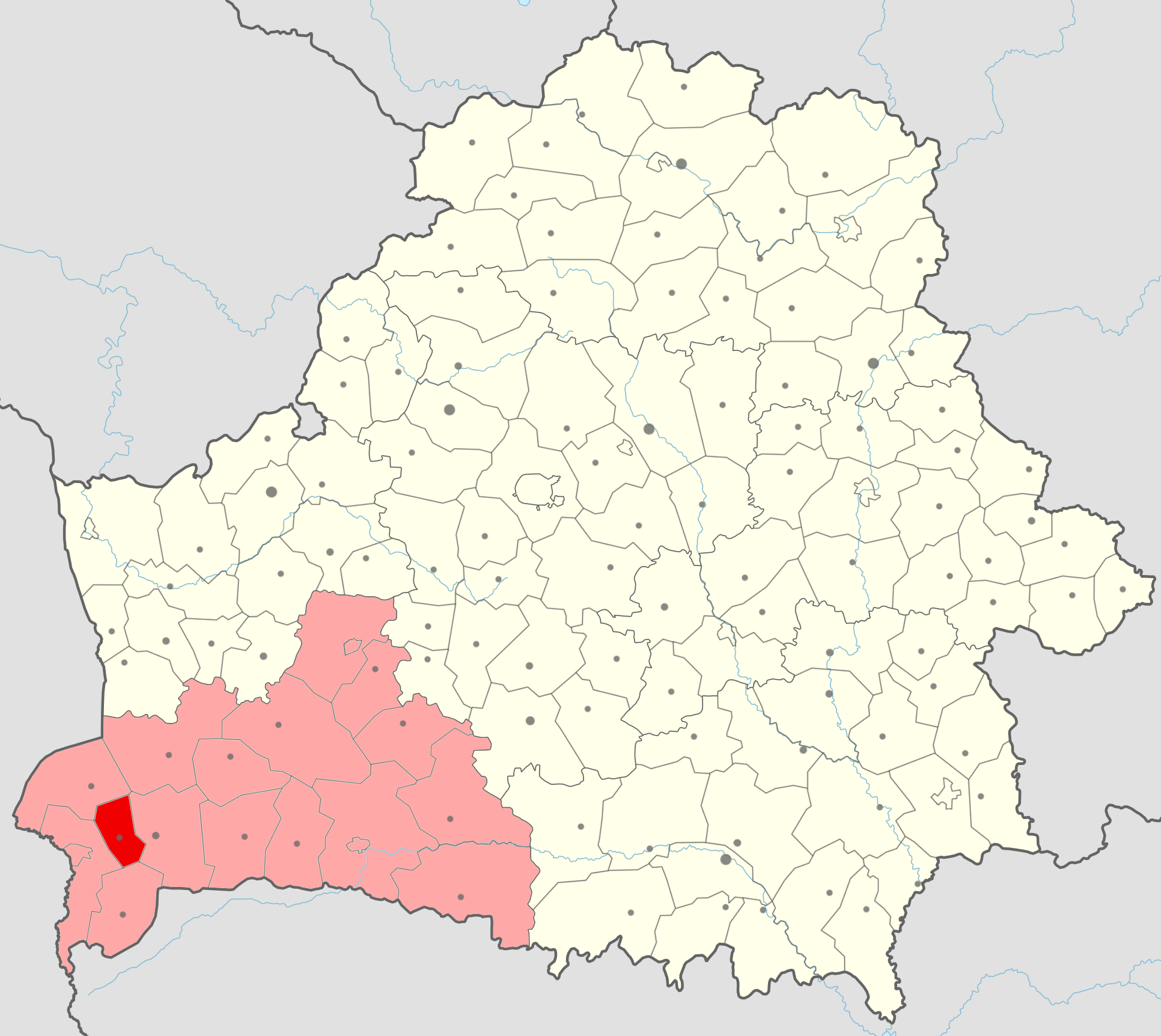
- Coordinates: 52°12′06″N 24°01′18″E
- Country: Belarus
- Region: Brest region
- Administrative center: Zhabinka

Area
  - District: 684.17 km^{2} (264.16 sq mi)

Population (2024)
  - District: 24,484
  - Density: 35.786/km^{2} (92.686/sq mi)
  - Urban: 14,418
  - Rural: 10,066
- Time zone: UTC+3 (MSK)
- Website: zhabinka.brest-region.gov.by

Zhabinka district (Belarusian: Жабінкаўскі раён; Russian: Жабинковский район) is a district (raion) of Brest region in Belarus. Its administrative center is Zhabinka. Administratively, the district is divided into seven rural councils. It is the smallest district in the country by area. As of 2024, it has a population of 24,484.

== History ==
Zhabinka district was formed on January 15, 1940. However, on August 8, 1959, it was disbanded and restored again on July 30, 1966.

== Geography ==
The northern part of the district is low-plain (altitude up to 200 m above sea level), the central and southern parts are Brest Polesia (about 150 m). The lands are mainly sod-podzolic, sandy and sandy loam.

The Mukhavets River flows through the district.

== Demographics ==
In 2014 the population of Zhabinka district was 24,469. Of these, 88.6% were of Belarusian, 5.5% Russian, 4.3% Ukrainian and 1.0% Polish ethnicity. 53.2% spoke Belarusian and 43.6% Russian as their native language. In 2023, it had a population of 24,454.
