= Mukhavets =

River in Belarus

Mukhavets River
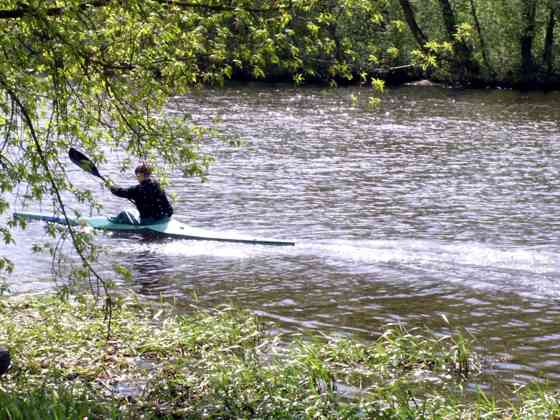
- The Mukhavets River at Brest, Belarus

Location
- Country: Belarus

Physical characteristics
- Source: Confluence of River Mukha and Viets Canal
  - location: Pruzhany, Belarus
  - coordinates: 52°33′48.96″N 24°27′8.28″E
- Mouth: Bug
  - location: Brest
  - coordinates: 52°4′52.11″N 23°39′8.5″E
- Length: 113 km (70 mi)
- Basin size: 6,600 km^{2} (2,500 sq mi)
- Discharge
  - average: 33.6 m^{3}/s (1,190 cu ft/s)

Basin features
- Progression: Bug→ Narew→ Vistula→ Baltic Sea

The Mukhavets (Note: Belarusian: Мухавец, romanized: Muchaviec [muxaˈvʲɛts]; Russian: Муховец, romanized: Muhovec, IPA: [mʊxɐˈvʲets]; Polish: Muchawiec, cyrillized: Мухавец, IPA: [muxaˈvʲɛts]) is a river in western Belarus.

A tributary of the Bug River, the Mukhavets rises in Pruzhany, Belarus, where the Mukha river and the Vyets canal converge, flows through south-western Belarus and merges with the Bug River in Brest.

The river is 113 km long with a 6,600 km^{2} (2,500 sq mi) basin area.

The Mukhavets is connected with the Dnieper river by the Dnieper–Bug Canal.

== Cities ==
- Pruzhany
- Kobryn
- Zhabinka
- Brest

== Tributaries ==
- Dakhlowka
- Zhabinka
- Trastsyanitsa
- Asipowka
- Ryta
