= Kobryn =

Kobryn Кобрын (Belarusian) Кобрин (Russian)
- Town
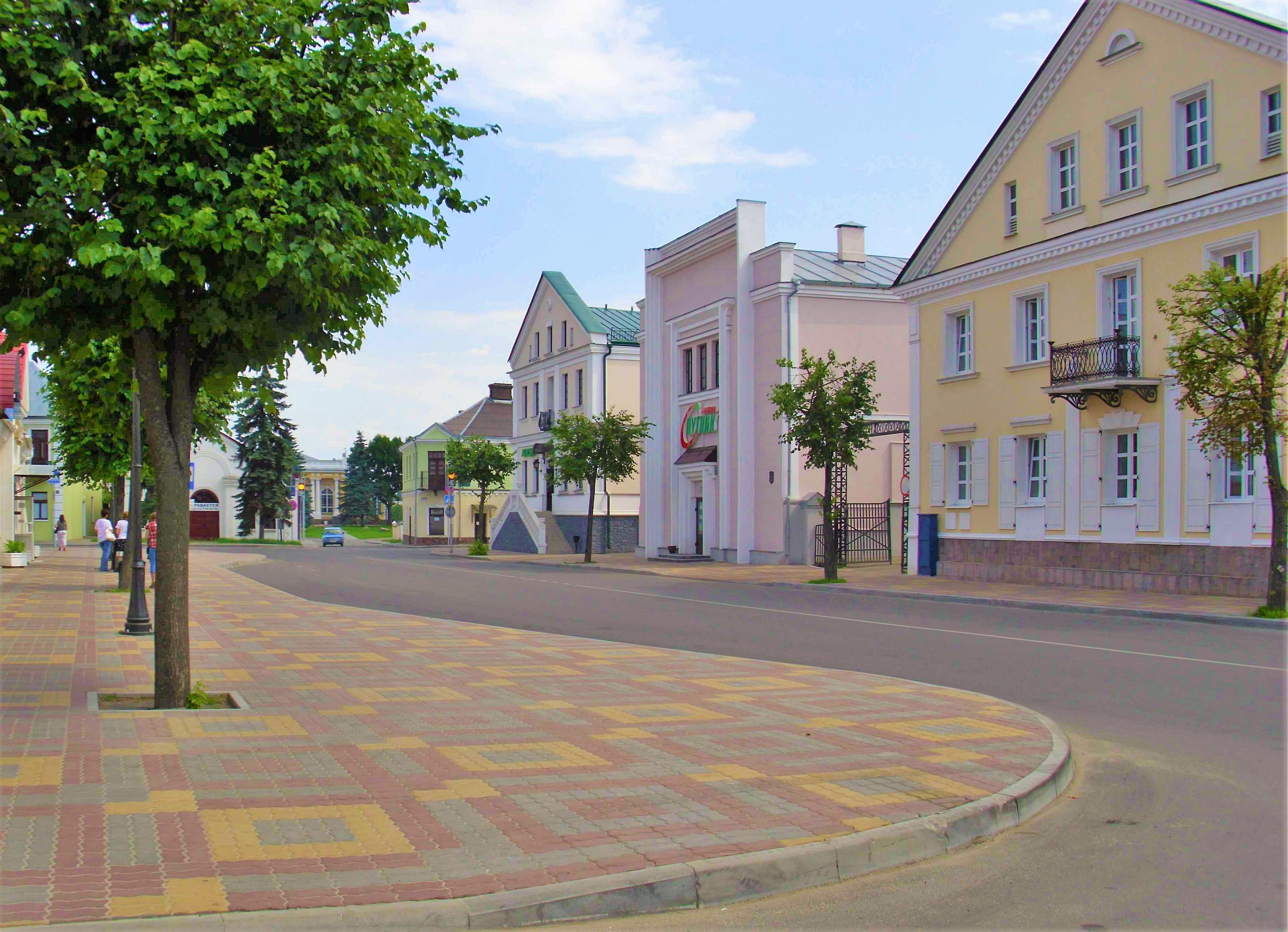
- Downtown Kobryn, c. 2010

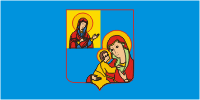
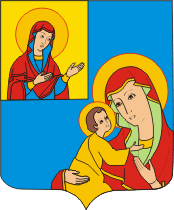
- Flag Coat of arms

- Location in Belarus
- Coordinates: 52°13′0″N 24°22′0″E
- Country: Belarus
- Region: Brest Region
- District: Kobryn District
- First mentioned: 1287

Government
  - Chairman: Mikhail Grishkevich

Area
  - Total: 26 km^{2} (10 sq mi)

Population (2026)
  - Total: 52,235
  - Density: 2,000/km^{2} (5,200/sq mi)
- Time zone: UTC+3 (MSK)
- Postal code: 225301—225306, 225860
- Area code: +375 1642
- License plate: 1
- Website: Official website (in Russian)

Kobryn or Kobrin (Note: Belarusian: Кобрын, Кобрынь, local pronunciation: [ˈkɔbrenʲ]; Russian: Кобрин; Ukrainian: Кобринь; Polish: Kobryń; Yiddish: קאָברין.) is a town in Brest Region, Belarus. It serves as the administrative center of Kobryn District. It is located in the region of Polesia in the southwestern corner of Belarus, where the Mukhavets river and Dnieper–Bug Canal meet. The town lies about 52 kilometres (32 mi) east of the city of Brest. As of 2026, it has a population of 52,235.

== History ==
In early times, it was inhabited by the ancient Baltic tribe of Yotvingians. At various times, the city belonged to Kingdom of Galicia–Volhynia, the Grand Duchy of Lithuania, the Polish–Lithuanian Commonwealth, the Russian Empire, the Second Polish Republic, the Byelorussian SSR, and the Republic of Belarus.

=== Middle Ages and early modern era ===
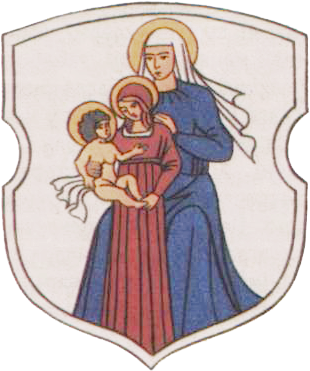
Historic coat of arms of Kobryn

In the 10th century, the area became part of the emerging Polish state under first ruler Mieszko I of Poland. Later, the area became part of Kievan Rus', the Principality of Volhynia, and the Kingdom of Galicia–Volhynia. Kobryn was first mentioned in 1287. In the early 14th century, the town formed part of the Grand Duchy of Lithuania, after the Union of Krewo (1385) in the Polish–Lithuanian union. It became the capital of a feudal principality within the Polish–Lithuanian realm, existing from 1387 to 1518. Starting from the 14th century, an Orthodox monastery functioned in Kobryn. The city's owners, the Kobrynski family, descended from Lithuanian grand duke Algirdas. In 1500, a princess, Anna Kobryńska, founded the Catholic church of the Assumption of the Virgin Mary. After 1518, Kobryn was ruled by Polish queen Bona Sforza, who contributed to its development and visited it several times.

Starting from the early 16th century, Kobryn belonged to the Podlachian, and later to the Berestia Voivodeships. The seat of a powiat, from 1589 to 1766 it was a royal city of the Polish–Lithuanian Commonwealth and was given Magdeburg rights. This allowed for a large number of Jews to settle in the area following the 16th century. The Jewish population in 1900 was 6,738. In Kobryń was held the county Sejmik of the Mozyrz County during the Russian occupation of Mozyrz in 1659. During the 17th century, the local Orthodox monastery was transferred to the Catholic Church. In 1774–1784, a canal was built connecting the Mukhavets River with the Pina River, named the Royal Canal after Polish king Stanisław August Poniatowski, who opened it, and as a result a water route was created connecting the Baltic Sea and the Black Sea.

=== Late modern era ===
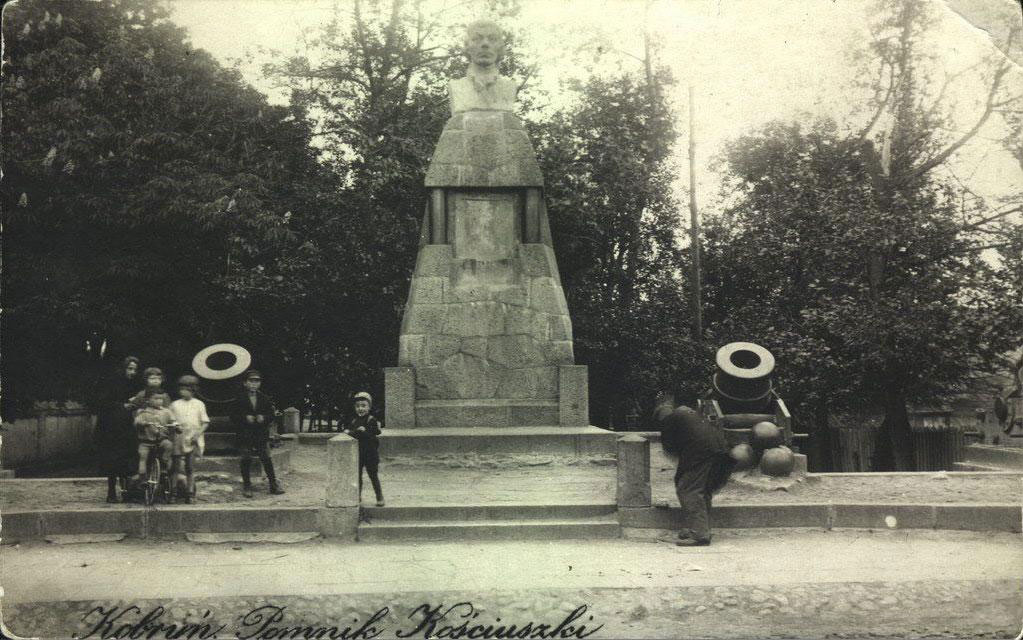
Interwar monument of Tadeusz Kościuszko in Kobryn

After the Partitions of Poland of 1795, the town was annexed by Imperial Russia. Catherine II gave Kobryn to Field Marshal Alexander Suvorov for his war merits, especially for the suppression of the Kościuszko Uprising by Polish insurgents. Under Russian rule, Kobryn was the centre of an uyezd (district), preserving that status until 1939. At the 1812 Battle of Kobrin, the first significant Russian victory over the French occurred during the French invasion of Russia. In 1838, the local monastery was closed down by authorities. After the unsuccessful January Uprising, anti-Polish repressions intensified: estates were confiscated, insurgents and landowners were deported to Siberia (see: sybirak), and a ban on land acquisition by ethnic Poles was introduced. Kobryn was occupied by Germany during World War I.

Kobryń came under Polish control in February 1919, four months after the establishment of the Second Polish Republic. During the Polish–Soviet War, it was the site of the Battle of Kobryń in September 1920. Polish rule was confirmed under the terms of the Treaty of Riga in 1921, and Kobryń became a seat of a powiat within the Polesie Voivodeship. After the war, crafts, small industry and trade developed again, and small factories were established. In 1923, a state gymnasium was founded, which three years later received the name of Maria Rodziewiczówna, a Polish writer living nearby, who co-financed the construction of the school.

=== World War II and recent times ===
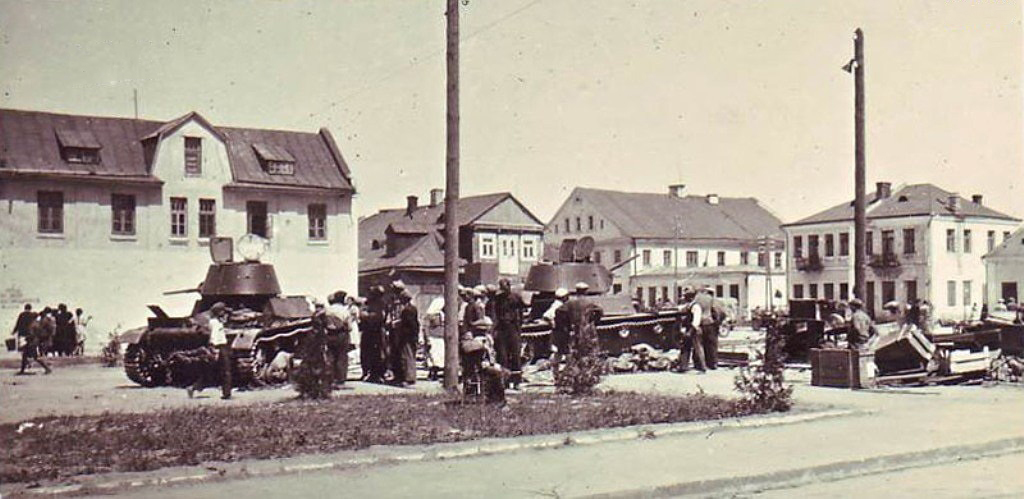
Kobryn during the occupation of Poland

During the 1939 German invasion of Poland, the Battle of Kobryń took place between the Polish 60th Infantry Division of Colonel Adam Epler and the German 19th Panzer Corps of General Heinz Guderian. After three days of fighting, the Poles withdrew southwards and the Germans entered the town, which they three days later handed over to the Soviets in accordance with the Molotov–Ribbentrop Pact. On 14 November 1939, Kobryn was incorporated into the Byelorussian SSR, despite lying in a territory dominated by ethnic Ukrainians.

From 23 June 1941 until 20 July 1944, following the German invasion of the Soviet Union, Kobryn was occupied by Nazi Germany and administered as a part of the Generalbezirk Wolhynien-Podolien of Reichskommissariat Ukraine. During the latter period, the majority of Jewish inhabitants were first amassed in a ghetto and then murdered by the Nazis in their extermination camps.

Two Polish priests, The Reverend Władysław Grobelny and Jan Wolski from Kobryń near Brześć, arrested for helping the Jews, were executed on October 15, 1942 together with a number of Jews from the Brześć ghetto.

In 1944, the town was captured by the Red Army. Since 1991, it has remained part of the Republic of Belarus.

== Notable people ==
- Gedaliah Alon (1901–1950), Israeli historian
- Aharon Becker (1905–1995), Israeli politician who served as a member of the Knesset
- Samuel Epstein (1919–2001), Polish-Canadian-American geo-chemist
- Enrique Oltuski (1930–2012), Cuban revolutionary and politician
- Oscar Zariski (1899–1986), American mathematician.

== Sights ==
Among the historical monuments of the city are the Catholic Church of the Dormition, Baroque Monastery of the Transfiguration, a park founded by Antoni Tyzenhauz in 1768, the Orthodox church of St. Alexander Nevsky, the building of the pre-war Polish Maria Rodziewiczówna State Gymnasium, the building of the pre-war town hall and the Catholic cemetery, where the family of the Polish national poet Adam Mickiewicz is buried.

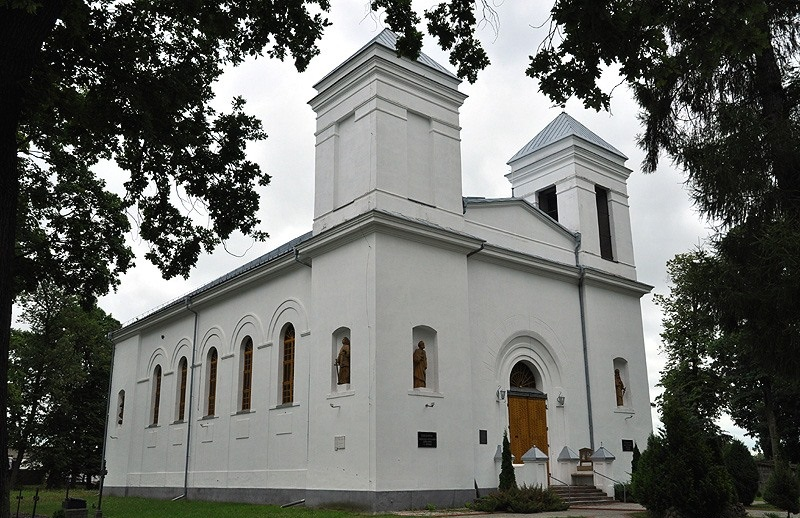
Church of the Dormition

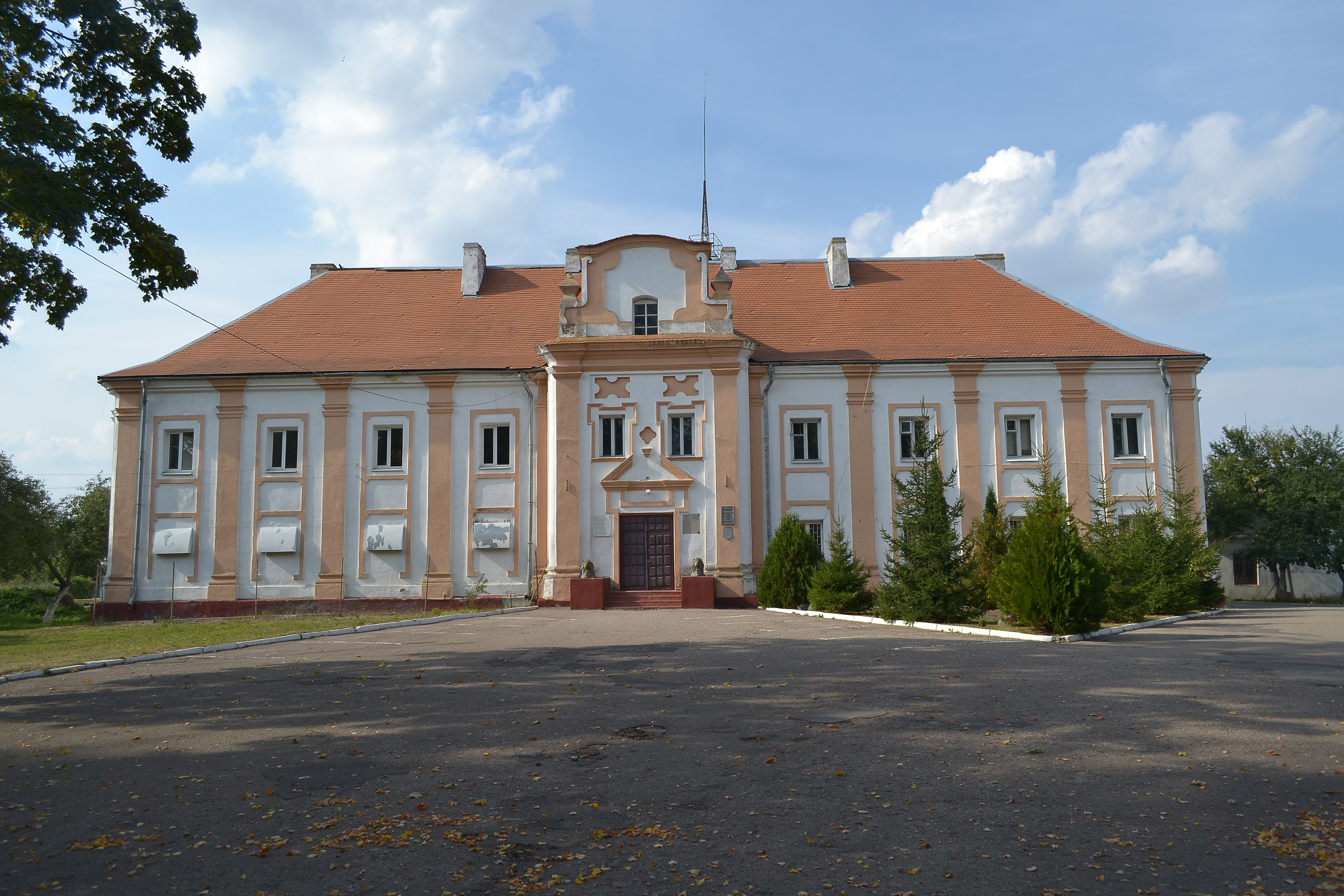
Monastery of the Transfiguration

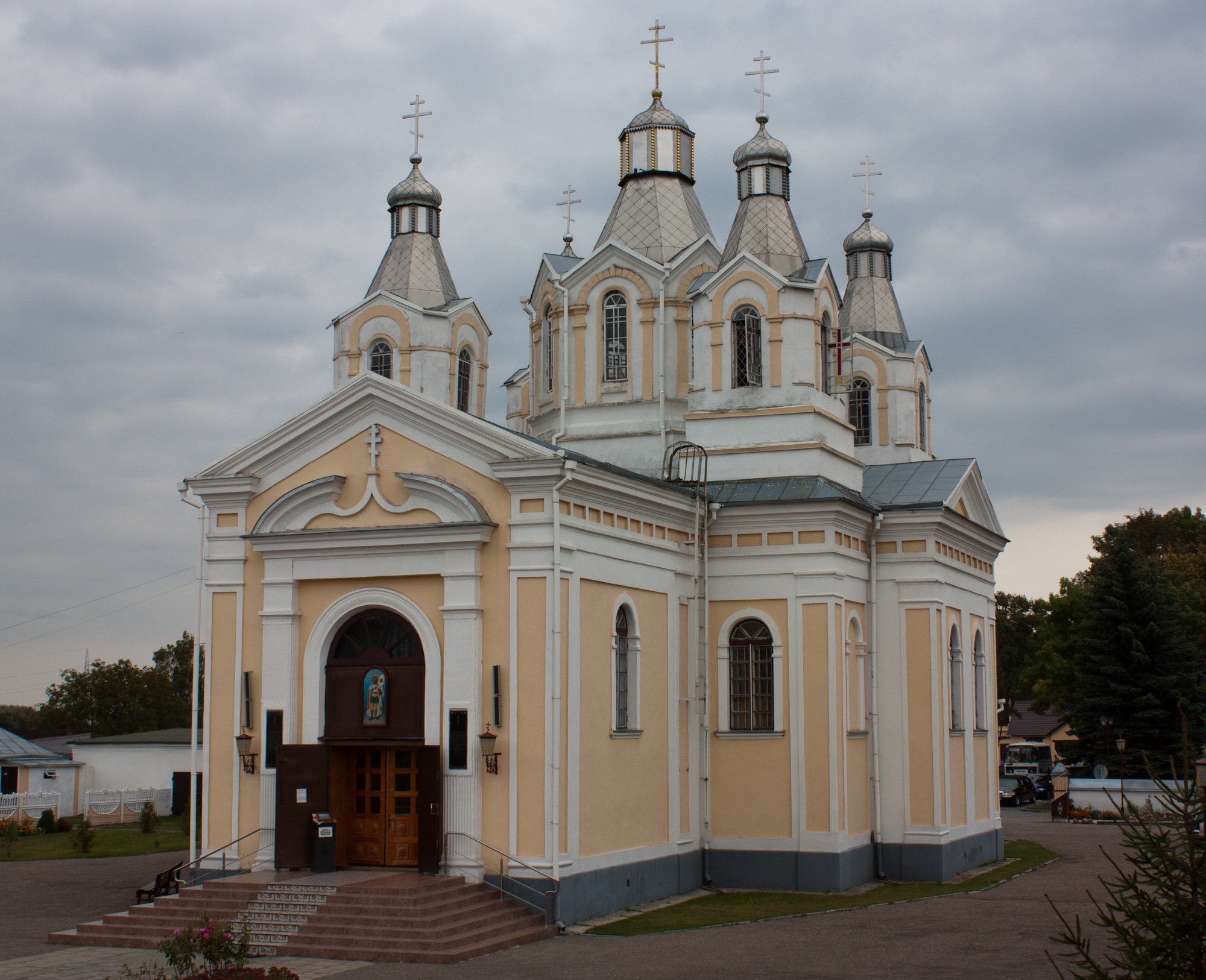
Church of St. Alexander Nevsky

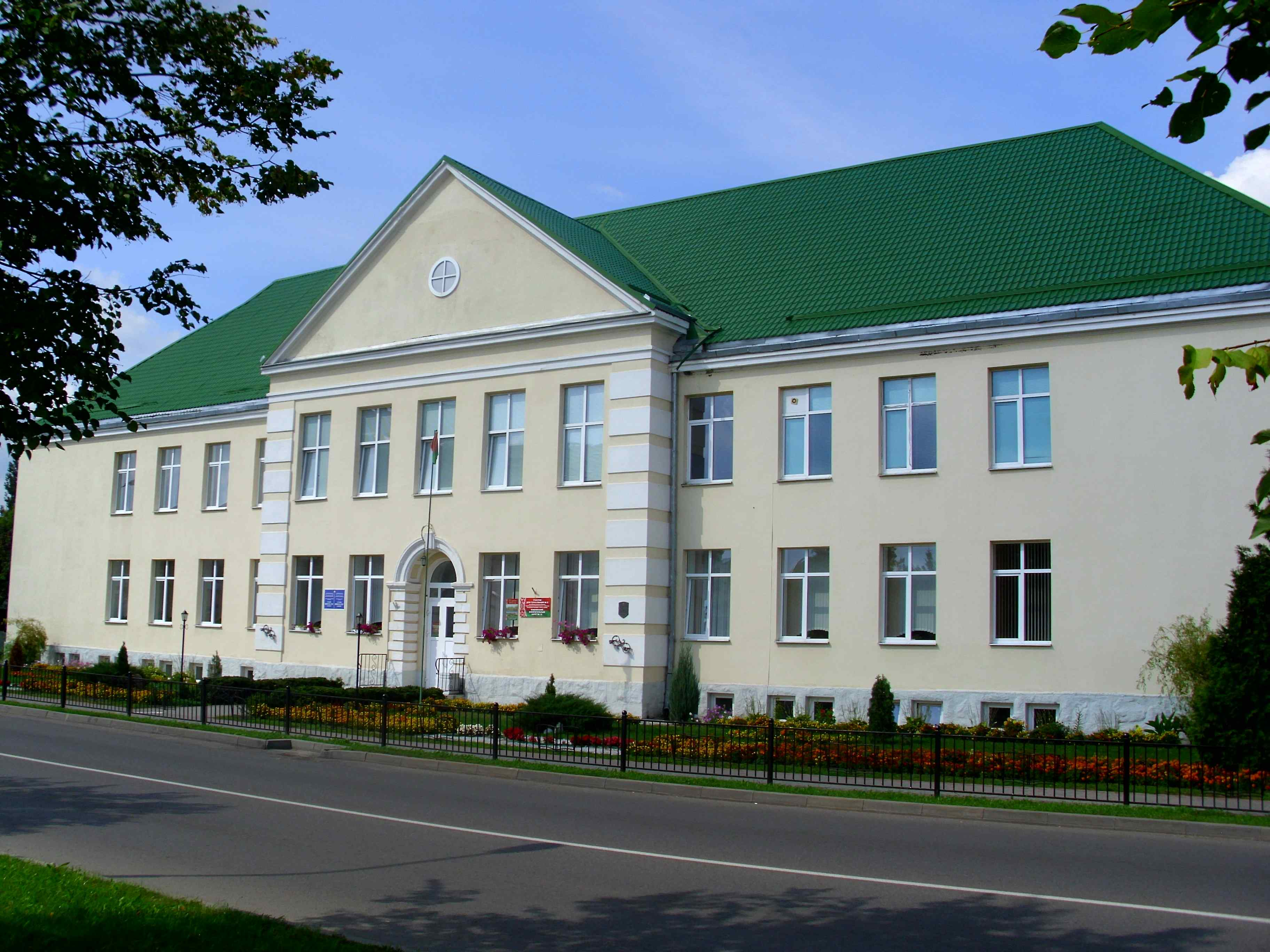
Maria Rodziewiczówna State Gymnasium building

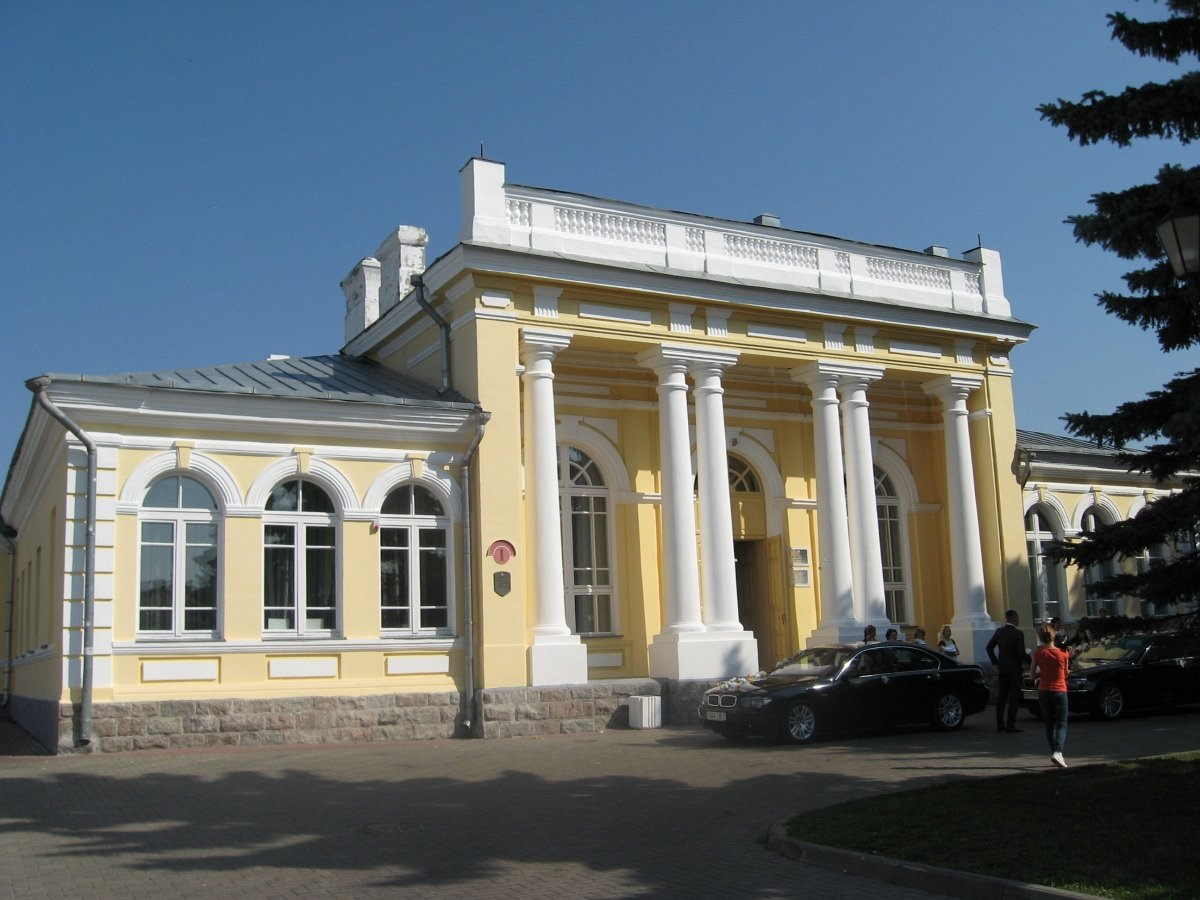
Former town hall

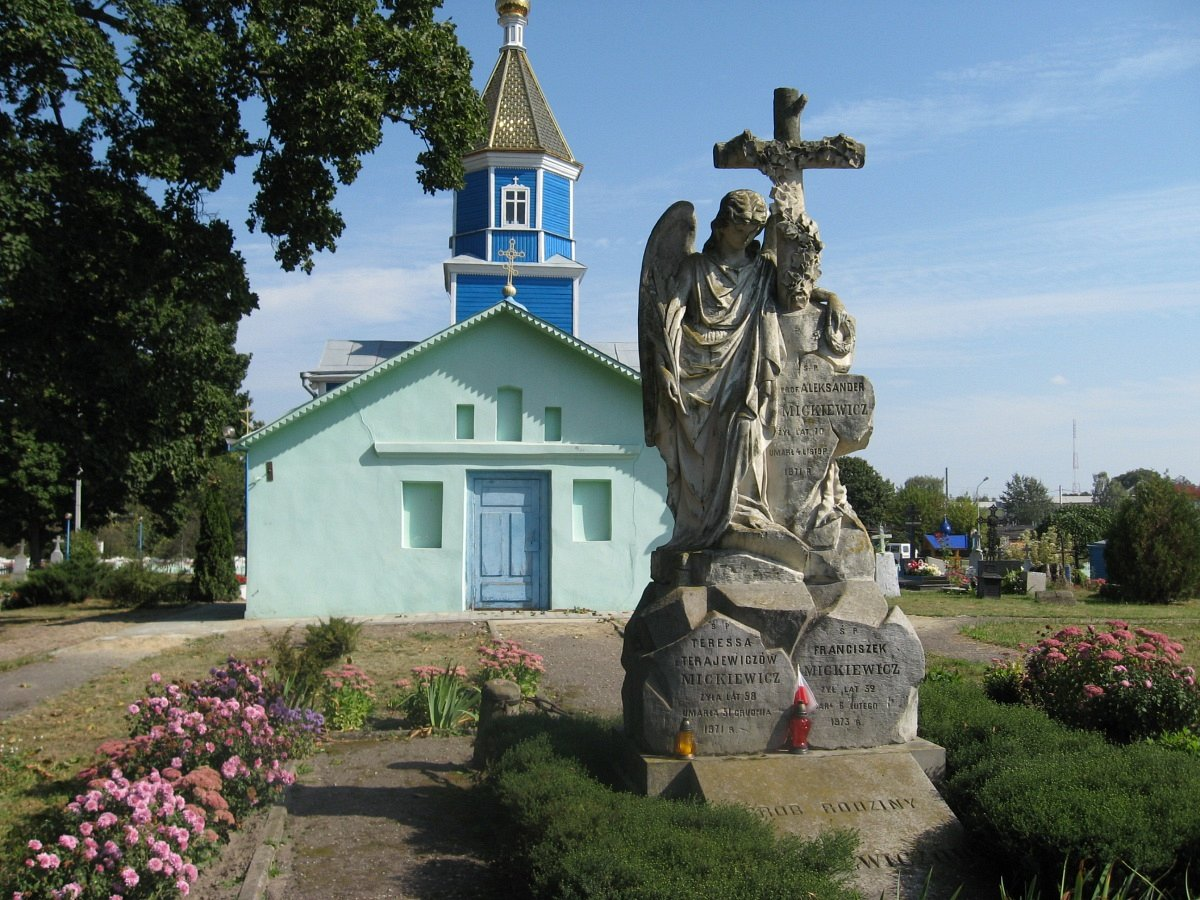
Grave of the Mickiewicz family at the Catholic cemetery
