= Franciszek Kleeberg =

Polish general

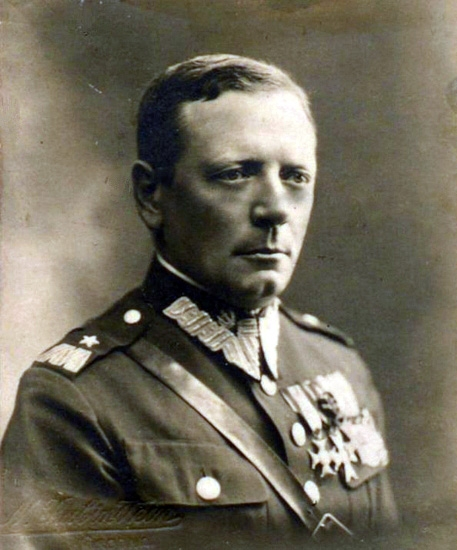
- Born: 1 February 1888; Tarnopol
- Died: 5 April 1941 (aged 53) near Dresden
- Burial place: Kock
- Military career
- Allegiance: Second Polish Republic
- Branch: Austro-Hungarian Army Polish Legions Polish Army
- Service years: 1914–1941
- Rank: Brigadier general Major general (posthumously)
- Commands: Independent Operational Group Polesie
- Conflicts: World War I Polish–Soviet War: World War II; Soviet Invasion of Poland; Battles of Parczew, Jabłoń and Milanów; German Invasion of Poland; Battle of Kock
- Awards: Virtuti Militari

Franciszek Kleeberg (1 February 1888, in Tarnopol, Austria-Hungary – 5 April 1941, near Dresden) was a Polish general. He served in the Austro-Hungarian Army before joining the Polish Legions in World War I and following the Polish Independence later the Polish Army. During the German Invasion of Poland he commanded Independent Operational Group Polesie (Polish: Samodzielna Grupa Operacyjna "Polesie"). He never lost a battle in the Invasion of Poland, although he was eventually forced to surrender after his forces ran out of ammunition. Imprisoned in Oflag IV-B Koenigstein, he died in a hospital in Dresden on 5 April 1941 and was buried there.

== Early life ==
General Franciszek Kleeberg was born on 1 February 1888 in Tarnopol (then part of the Austro-Hungarian Empire, next Tarnopol in interwar Poland again, now Ternopil Ukraine). He was of German and Swedish ancestry on his paternal side. His father, an officer of the Austrian Dragoons, took part in the Polish uprising of 1863/64. After graduation from the military vocational school at Hranice (Mährisch Weißkirchen) in Moravia, Kleeberg continued studies at military academy in Mödling, Lower Austria. Promoted to the 2nd Lieutenant in artillery, he served in the capital Vienna, where he completed studies at the Academy of the General Staff (k.u.k. Kriegsschule).

== War experience ==
He took part in the First World War, first in the Austro-Hungarian army, and after May 1915 as an officer in the Polish Legion. He commanded a regiment in the Polish–Soviet War of 1919–1921. In 1925 he completed studies at a French military school in Paris and became the commander of the Supreme Military School in Warsaw. After Jozef Pilsudski's coup d'état, he was dismissed from that post in 1927 and sent to command an infantry division in Grodno.

=== World War II ===
At the time of the outbreak of World War II, Brigadier General Kleeberg was the commander of the IX Army Corps in Brzesc in the rear operational zone. However, soon the situation changed in view of massive enemy air raids and rapid advance of its armoured and mechanized troops. On 11 September 1939, his corps was transformed into the Operation Group Polesie, but was lacking in heavy equipment, and by 14 September was already in combat with the most advanced German troops. Kleeberg managed to organize a defence by withdrawing dispersed units from under the strike of the German forces, but found many of his units also attacked by the Red army. He also managed to gather remnants of the Polish forces destroyed in the east to Vistula and south-east to Narew into a new grouping, with which he tried to break through towards besieged Warsaw. After hearing of Warsaw's capitulation, he dug his troops in, resulting in the battle of Kock. On 5 October 1939, Kleeberg decided to surrender, as his forces were out of ammunition and food.

== Death ==
General Kleeberg was imprisoned in Oflag IV-B Koenigstein, where he lost his sight and became unable to walk. He died aged 53 in the camp hospital and was buried in Dresden. In 1969, his remains were exhumed, brought to Poland and re-buried in Kock among the fallen soldiers of the Operation Group Polesie.

== Promotions ==
- podporucznik (lieutenant) – August 1908
- porucznik (first lieutenant) – May 1913
- kapitan (captain) – November 1915
- major (major) – August 1917
- podpułkownik (lieutenant colonel) – December 1918
- pułkownik (colonel) – April 1920
- generał brygady (brigadier general) – January 1928
- generał dywizji (divisional general) – January 1943 (post-mortem)

== Military awards ==
- Virtuti Militari, Commander's Cross, (previously awarded Knight's Cross, Golden Cross and Silver Cross)
- Polonia Restituta, Grand Cross awarded posthumously on 4 October 2009; (previously awarded Commander's Cross and Officer's Cross)
- Cross of Valour 4 times
- Military Merit Medal (Signum Laudis) (Austria-Hungary)
- Commander of the Légion d'honneur (France)
- Iron Cross of 1914, 2nd Class (Germany)
- Order of Lāčplēsis, 3rd Class (Latvia)
- Gold Cross of Merit (1937)
