= Sarny Fortified Area =

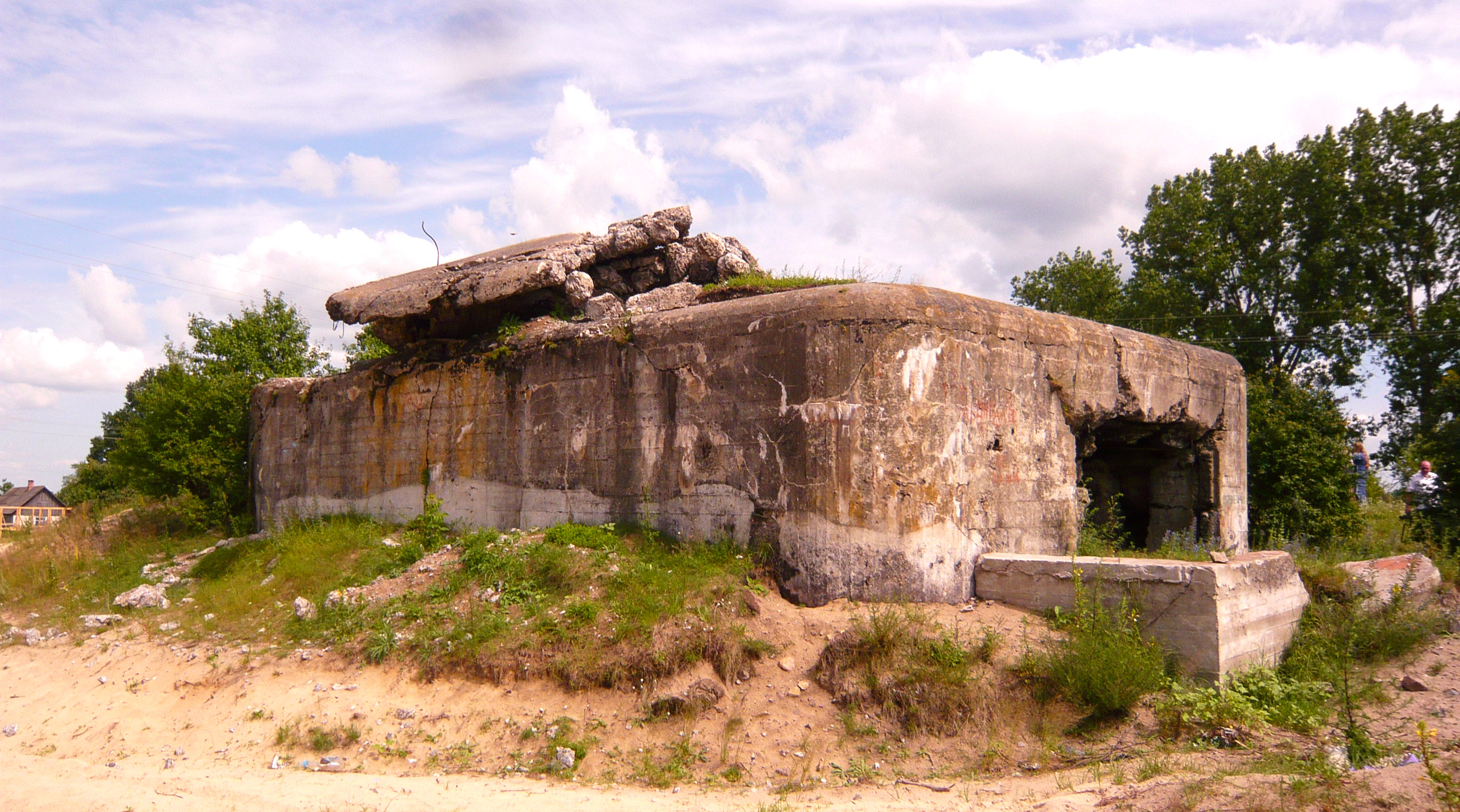
Sunny Fortified Area Bunker

Sarny Fortified Area (known in Polish in several names: Sarneński Rejon Umocniony, Sarneński Odcinek Umocniony, Bastion Polesie) was a line of bunkers and trenches along both sides of the Sluch River, in the area of the town of Sarny, northern Volhynia, in Ukraine. During the interbellum period, Sarny belonged to the Second Polish Republic and was near the border with the Soviet Union. As the Polish military authorities regarded the Soviets as the main threat (Plan East), construction of fortifications began in 1936. It was planned to be fully operational in the spring of 1940. The total length of the defence works was some 170 km, with 358 objects.

== Structure ==
The defence works were up to 5 deep and were connected by the radio, but the walls of the some bunkers were so thick that operators had to go outside. Every bunker had up to 30 soldiers of the Border Defence Corps (KOP), who were equipped with 75 mm cannons and machine guns. The Border Defence Corps Regiment "Sarny", which operated the Area, was very well trained, and its soldiers, including Władysław Raginis, distinguished themselves during the Battle of Wizna (see Polish September Campaign) and in other battlefields in the area of Osowiec and Upper Silesia, where up to 80% of them died or were wounded.

== Soviet invasion ==
The soldiers who remained in the Sarny Fortified Area were ordered in mid-September 1939 to abandon the bunkers and to move with their equipment towards the Romanian Bridgehead. On 16 September 1939, the eve of the Soviet invasion of Poland, there were smaller units defending the area: two fortress battalions (Sarny) and (Malynsk), two border battalions (Rokitno) and (Berezne) and a cavalry squadron (Bystrzyce). There were altogether some 4000 soldiers, but they lacked heavy equipment, as it had been sent towards the German border in the summer of 1939.

=== Defence ===
On the morning of 17 September 1939 Soviet aircraft bombed the trucks, which were getting ready to move south. Also, the railway junction in Sarny was bombed, but the armoured train Marszalek repelled the enemy. However, Colonel Nikodem Sulik and General Wilhelm Orlik-Rueckemann decided to unload the equipment and to take up defence positions. The area was attacked by the Soviet 60th Rifle Division, whose advantage was crushing. The Poles defended the fortifications for three days. On 20 September, facing encirclement, they had to withdraw. However, soldiers in some bunkers did not get the order to withdraw, and in some places, the Poles resisted until 25 September. Several bunkers were blown up by the Red Army engineers with their crews, while an unknown number of soldiers were murdered, including seven officers, who were shot near the Orthodox church in the village of Tynne.

Among those killed was Lieutenant Jan Bolbot, who was in 1989 posthumously awarded the Virtuti Militari, Poland's highest military decoration. He commanded a platoon of 50 men who holed up in their bunker and refused to surrender despite hopeless odds. Bolbot's men stopped Soviet attacks with heavy losses. Unable to beat the Poles, the Soviets set the bunker on fire. Bolbot and his entire command died in the flames.

In late September, the defenders of Sarny, as part of Independent Operational Group Polesie, took part in two major battles against the Red Army: the Battle of Szack and the Battle of Wytyczno.

== Aftermath ==
In late 1939 and early 1940, the Soviets carried out detailed investigations of the defence works. In the mid-1940s, the bunkers served as hideouts for Ukrainian nationalist partisans of the Ukrainian Insurgent Army. Today, the bunkers are in ruin.

== Sources ==
- Polish Army Website : 17 września 1939 roku - agresja sowiecka na Polskę ("17 September 1939 - Soviet attack on Poland") (in Polish)
- Forteca : Fortification with underground passages in Polesie
- World War II Database : Invasion of Poland

== See also ==
- Hel Fortified Area
- Fortified Area of Silesia
