= 8th Cavalry =

8th Cavalry may refer to:

== Divisions ==
- 8th Cavalry Division (German Empire), a unit of the German Army during the First World War
- 8th SS Cavalry Division Florian Geyer, a unit of the Waffen-SS during the Second World War
- 8th Cavalry Division (Russian Empire)
- 8th Guards Cavalry Division, a division of the Soviet Union

== Brigades ==
- 8th (Lucknow) Cavalry Brigade, a unit of the Indian Army during the First World War
- 8th Cavalry Brigade (United Kingdom), a unit of the British Army during the First World War

== Regiments ==
- 8th Lancers, later known as the 8th Cavalry, a regiment of the Indian Army until 1921
- 8th Light Cavalry, a regiment of the Indian Army from 1922 onwards
- 8th Lithuanian Cavalry Regiment
- 8th Cavalry (Pakistan)
- 8th Cavalry Regiment, a unit of the United States Army
- 8th Illinois Cavalry Regiment, a Union regiment during the American Civil War
- 8th Indiana Cavalry Regiment, a Union regiment during the American Civil War
- 8th Iowa Cavalry Regiment, a Union regiment during the American Civil War
- 8th Kentucky Cavalry Regiment (Union), a Union regiment during the American Civil War
- 8th Michigan Cavalry Regiment, a Union regiment during the American Civil War
- 8th Mississippi Cavalry Regiment, a Confederate regiment during the American Civil War
- 8th Missouri Cavalry Regiment (Union), a Union regiment during the American Civil War
- 8th New York Cavalry Regiment, a Union regiment during the American Civil War
- 8th Ohio Cavalry Regiment, a Union regiment during the American Civil War
- 8th Pennsylvania Cavalry Regiment, a Union regiment during the American Civil War
- 8th Tennessee Cavalry Regiment (Union), a Union regiment during the American Civil War
- 8th Texas Cavalry Regiment, popularly known as Terry's Texas Rangers, a Confederate regiment during the American Civil War
- 8th Virginia Cavalry Regiment, a Confederate regiment during the American Civil War
