= Stanisław Brykalski =

Lieutenant of the Polish Army

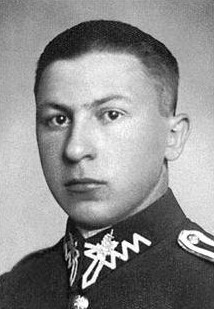
- Born: April 6, 1912; Słomniki, Galicia and Lodomeria, Austria-Hungary
- Died: September 9, 1939 (aged 27); Góra Strękowa, Warsaw Voivodeship, Poland
- Military career
- Allegiance: Poland
- Branch: Polish Armed Forces
- Service years: 1938–1939
- Rank: Lieutenant
- Conflicts: World War II: 4–10 September; Battle of Wizna †

Stanisław Brykalski, pseudonym Kogutek, was a Polish Lieutenant and a deputy defense commander of Wizna along with Władysław Raginis. After his death, which happened during the Battle of Wizna, he was posthumously promoted to captain.

== Biography ==
=== World War II ===
Stanisław Brykalski was born on April 6, 1912 in Słomniki as the son of Jan and Marianna Brykalski. After graduating from schools in Miechów and Kraków, he entered the Kraków school of cadets. In 1938 he underwent military training and was appointed to the rank of lieutenant. In the same year he was drafted into the Polish Armed Forces and incorporated into the 71st Infantry Regiment. He served as the commander of an artillery platoon.

The outbreak of World War II found him in the fortified section of the Wizna area, near Łomża. As the commander of the artillery, consisting of 4 light 76.2 mm cannons, he was also the deputy commander of the section along with Capt. Władysław Raginis. During the initial fights with the soldiers of the XIX Army Corps of Heinz Guderian, he and his superior swore not to give up their defensive positions.

He died on September 9, 1939. This happened during the observation of the battlefield in the observation dome of the command bunker on Góra Strękowa. He was wounded in the head by a shell fragment. Only later, on September 13 and with the consent of a German officer, the body of Lieutenant Brykalski, and the body of his commander Capt. Raginis were buried in the immediate vicinity of the command bunker.

=== Burial and funeral ===
At the end of September, after the territory was taken over by the Soviets under the Molotov–Ribbentrop Pact, the occupation forces ordered the bodies to be excavated and buried 500 meters further. They were buried in the road lane at the foot of the hill. In the 1950s, the remains of the officers were once again dug up and moved to another place which has been unknown for years.

After the war, a plaque was placed in Wizna with the following inscription: "Passer-by, tell your Homeland that we fought to the end, fulfilling our duty."

In August 2011, members of the Wizna 1939 Association found an anonymous grave by the Wizna-Jeżewo road and carried out exhumation work. The heroes' funeral was held on September 10, 2011. First, a solemn funeral mass for Captain Władysław Raginis and Lieutenant Stanisław Brykalski was held in the parish church in Wizna. The mass was led by Bishop Ordinarius of the Roman Catholic Diocese of Łomża. After that, a solemn funeral of the defenders of the "Wizna" section took place in the war grave located inside the broken command bunker.

On August 21, 2012, the Minister of National Defense, Tomasz Siemoniak, signed a decision on the posthumous promotion of Stanisław Brykalski to the rank of captain.

His grave is located in the parish cemetery in Słomniki.

== Awards ==
On August 28, 2009, the President of the Republic of Poland, Lech Kaczyński, posthumously awarded Brykalski the Commander's Cross with the Star of the Order of Polonia Restituta. The award was given for outstanding services for the independence of the Republic of Poland.

== Legacy ==
A street in Słomniki is named after Lieutenant Stanisław Brykalski.

The Riflemen's Association, Wołomin Branch (1939 Rifle Unit), adorned the name of Capt. Stanisław Brykalski and celebrated the 76th anniversary of the Battle of Wizna, Góra Strękowa, on September 12, 2015.

Under the patronage of the "Wizna 1939" Association, a mural was created devoted to the commander of the artillery of the "Wizna" section.
