= Border Defence Corps Regiment "Sarny" =

Part of the Second Polish Republic's Border Defence Corps

Border Defense Corps Regiment Sarny was a unit of the Second Polish Republic's Border Defence Corps, stationed in Sarny, Wołyń Voivodeship (now Ukraine), near pre-1939 Polish – Soviet border.

It was created on May 18, 1931, and was part of the Border Defence Corps Brigade Polesie. Its original commandant was Colonel Jerzy Plachta-Platowicz, who was replaced with Colonel Nikodem Sulik. Later, Sulik became commandant of the 5th Border Infantry Division, part of General's Władysław Anders Polish II Corps. Plachta-Platowicz died on September 18, 1939, near Janów Lubelski.

In the summer of 1939, the Regiment sent the bulk of its forces to western Poland. Part of it headed to Upper Silesia, to man the Fortified Area Silesia, and some units went to the fortress of Osowiec, near the border with East Prussia. Among those, who gave their lives fighting the German aggressors, was the Regiment's Captain Władysław Raginis

Those units that remained in Wołyń Voivodeship, manned the Sarny Fortified Area, which guarded the Polish-Soviet border. On September 17, following the Soviet aggression on Poland (see: Molotov–Ribbentrop Pact), the Regiment's forces engaged in heavy fighting with more numerous and much stronger troops of the Red Army's 60th Rifle Division. Polish soldiers fought to the last bullet, halting the Soviet advance until September 20. The Soviets, unable to break the defenses, set bunkers on fire, and also murdered a number of Polish soldiers.

After withdrawal from the Sarny Fortified Area, the remaining part of the Regiment joined the Independent Operational Group Polesie and took part in Battle of Szack and Battle of Wytyczno.

== See also ==
- Polish army order of battle in 1939
- Polish contribution to World War II

== Sources ==
- Jerzy Prochwicz, "Walki oddzialów KOP na obszarach pólnocno-wschodniej Polski", Bialoruskie Zeszyty Historyczne nr 13, Białystok 2000.
- Jerzy Prochwicz, Andrzej Konstankiewicz, Jan Rutkiewicz, "Korpus Ochrony Pogranicza 1924–1939", wyd. Barwa i Broƒ, Warszawa 2003
