= 8th Kentucky Infantry Regiment =

8th Kentucky Infantry Regiment may refer to:

- 8th Kentucky Infantry Regiment (Confederate), a regiment in the Confederate States Army
- 8th Kentucky Infantry Regiment (Union), a regiment in the Union Army

== See also ==
- 8th Kentucky Cavalry Regiment, a regiment in the Union Army
