= Plan West =

Polish Army Military Plan in World War 2

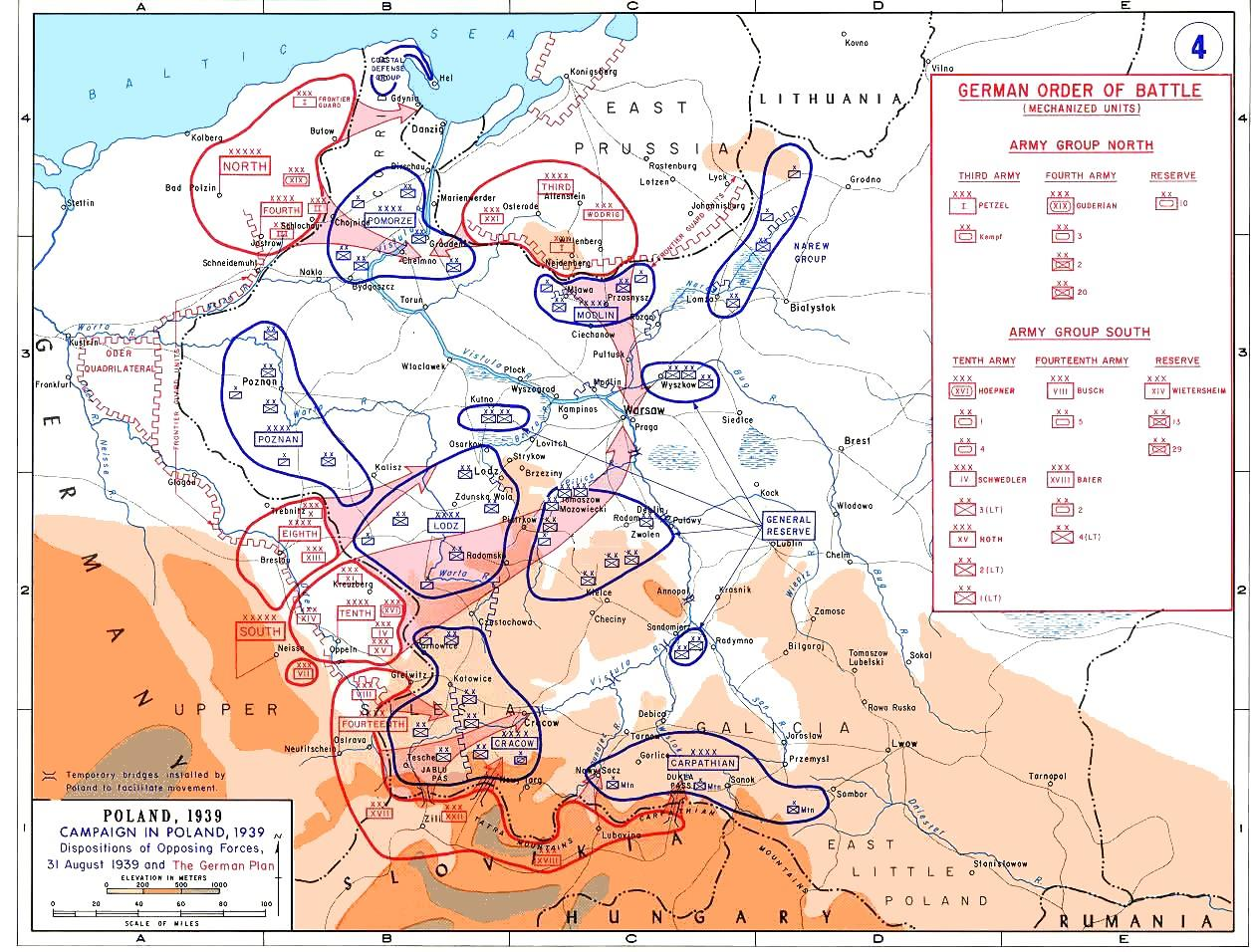
Dispositions of opposing forces, August 31, 1939, and the German plan

Plan West (Polish: Plan Zachód) was a military plan of the Polish Army of the Second Polish Republic, for defence against invasion from Nazi Germany. It was designed in the late 1930s.

== Background ==
While Józef Piłsudski was the dictator of Poland, planning concentrated on a possible attack on Poland from the east. It was only after Piłsudski's death in 1935 that the new Polish government and military re-evaluated the situation and decided that the current Polish plan for a Polish–German war, dating from the mid-1920s (Plan "S"), was inadequate and needed to be revised.

However up to 1938, the priority remained in the east, not the west, and most Polish fortifications were being erected on the Polish–Soviet border.

== Details ==
The first version predicted that Germans would attack from Pomerania towards Warsaw, with supporting thrusts from Silesia and Prussia, aiming at establishing an early link through the Polish Corridor between German Pomerania and Prussia. After German annexation of parts of Czechoslovakia and changes of borders, Polish planners revised the plan with the expectation that a main thrust would originate from Silesia through Piotrków and Łódź towards Warsaw and Kraków. The Polish planners correctly predicted the direction of most German thrusts, with one crucial exception: they assigned low priority to a possible deep, flanking, eastward push from Prussia and Slovakia, but that push was assigned high priority in the German plan (Fall Weiss).

A controversy involved the decision whether Polish forces should defend the lengthy borders or should withdraw east and south and try to defend a shorter line, backed with rivers. Although the second plan was more militarily sound, political considerations outweighed them, as Polish politicians were concerned that Germany could be satisfied with occupation of some disputed territories (like the Free City of Danzig, the Polish Corridor and Silesia) and then push for an early end of the war after it had occupied those territories. The western regions were also the most densely populated ones and had major industrial centres, which were crucial for mobilization and any continued military production of equipment and supply for the Polish Army.

Even with the decision to protect the borders, the fact that Poland was virtually encircled from three sides by the Germans caused the decision that some areas were almost impossible to defend and so had to be abandoned early on. That was the case for the northwestern Pomorze Voivodeship and Poznań Voivodeship. A separate force, the Land Coastal Defence, was to protect key parts of the coast as long as possible, and most of the surface Polish Navy was to be evacuated to the United Kingdom as specified in the Peking Plan (submarines were to engage the enemy in the Baltic Sea, according to the Worek Plan). The main Polish defence line was to be formed on the regions of the Augustów Primeval Forest – Biebrza River – Narew River – Vistula River (and the towns of Modlin, Toruń, Bydgoszcz) – Inowrocław Lakes – Warta River – Widawka River – town of Częstochowa – Silesian fortifications – town of Bielsko-Biała – town of Żywiec – village of Chabówka – and the town of Nowy Sącz). The second defensive line was based on the Augustów Forest - Biebrza River – Narew River – Bug River – Vistula River – and Dunajec River. Finally, the third defensive line involved retreating southeast towards the Romanian border and holding as long as possible in the region of the Romanian Bridgehead.

The plan assumed the Soviet Union would be neutral, as a German–Soviet alliance seemed unlikely. The plan, however, allowed for Lithuania to try to take Wilno, a city disputed between Poland and Lithuania, and a small Polish force, primarily elite units of Border Defence Corps, was detached to secure that region.

The plan assumed that Polish forces would be able to hold for several months but would be pushed back by the German numerical and technical superiority, which was estimated to be two or three to one. Then, the Western Allies (France and the United Kingdom), obliged by the Franco-Polish alliance and the Polish–British Common Defence Pact), would launch an offensive from the west, which would draw enough German forces away from the east to allow Polish forces to launch a counteroffensive.

== Effectiveness ==
The plan correctly assumed the size, location and most of the directions of attack by the enemy. When the Germans attacked, however, the second and further defensive lines and related items were not fully defined by the plan, and none of its aspects had been subject to a military exercise. There were also other unfinished parts, particularly those dealing with communications and supplies.

When Germany invaded Poland on 1 September 1939, Polish forces were dealt a significant defeat at the Battle of the Border, just as critics of the plan had predicted. Further factors, such as underestimating German mobility and blitzkrieg strategy and overestimating Polish mobility, the Soviet invasion of Poland and lack of promised aid from the Western Allies, contributed to the Polish defeat by 6 October 1939.

== See also ==
- Plan East, a Polish defensive plan in case of an attack by the Soviet Union
- Western betrayal
