= Polish Thermopylae =

Various battles in Polish history

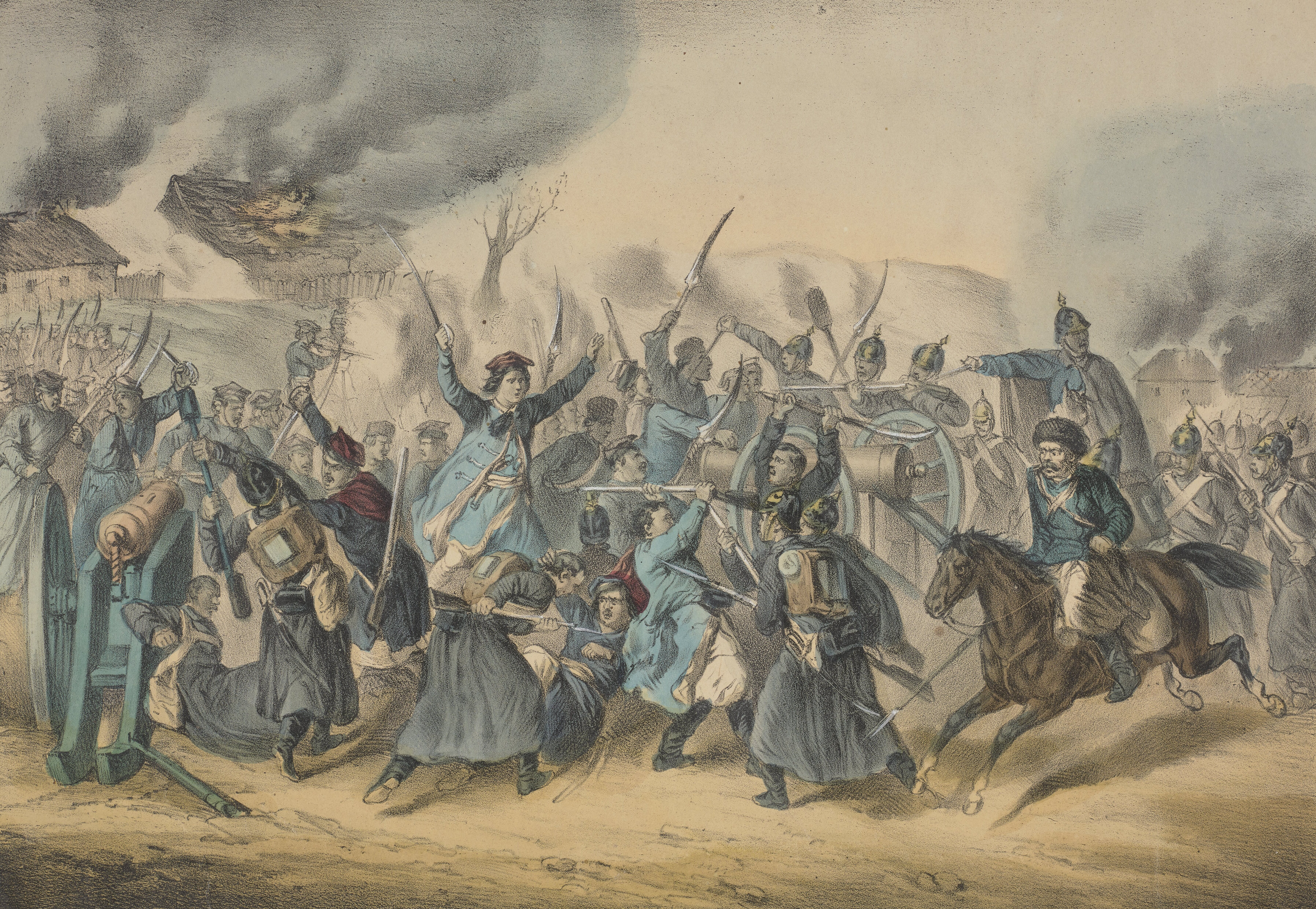
Bitwa pod Węgrowem (Battle of Węgrów)

The Polish Thermopylae (Note: Polish: Polskie Termopile) is a name used to refer to several battles in Polish history. The Polish Thermopylae is a reference to the Battle of Thermopylae, where a Spartan force chose to fight to the death while vastly outnumbered.

== Famous last stands dubbed "the Polish Thermopylae" ==
- Battle of Klushino (4 July 1610) – a battle of the Polish–Muscovite War between forces of the Crown of the Kingdom of Poland and the Tsardom of Russia. In the battle the outnumbered Polish force secured a decisive victory over Russia. The battle is remembered as one of the greatest triumphs of the Polish cavalry and an example of the excellence and supremacy of the Polish military at the time. (6,500 Poles defeated 30,000 Russians and 5,000 mercenaries.)
- Battle of Hodów (11 June 1694) – a battle of the War of the Holy League between the Polish army and the Tatar army of the Crimean Khanate. The Polish hussars defeated their enemies, bringing victory to the Polish army, despite being vastly outnumbered (around 40,000 Tatars against 400 Poles).
- Battle of Węgrów (3 February 1863) – this battle was part of the January Uprising (Polish: powstanie styczniowe) and it inspired Auguste Barbier, a French poet, to write a poem entitled “Atak pod Węgrowem” (The Charge at Węgrów), in which he compared the attack of the Polish scythemen troops on Russian cannon to the heroic deeds of the ancient Spartiates. The comparison soon became popular in Europe, leading to a wave of popular support for the Polish cause. Barbier was not the only poet to compare the Poles to Spartans; similar references are contained in poems such as “Vanitas” (by Cyprian Kamil Norwid) or “Bój pod Węgrowem” (Maria Konopnicka).
- Battle of Zadwórze (17 August 1920) – part of the Polish-Soviet War, during which a Polish army battalion consisting of the Lwów Eaglets (Polish: Orlęta Lwowskie) barred the way to Lwów preventing an advance of the 1st Cavalry Army commanded by Semyon Budyonny. 318 of the 330 soldiers were killed, and some were taken prisoner. Captain Bolesław Zajączkowski, the battalion's commander, took his own life together with several of his soldiers, and was later nicknamed the ‘Polish Leonidas’. The bodies of five identified officers were buried at the Cemetery of the Defenders of Lwów. The remaining ones were buried in a kurgan on the battlefield. The kurgan bears a memorial plaque which reads: “To the Lwów Eaglets, who fell protecting the entire borderland on 17 August of 1920.”
- Battle of Dytiatyn (16 September 1920) – another battle fought during the Polish-Soviet War, where the subdivisions of the 13th Infantry Regiment and two batteries of the 8th Artillery Brigade with a force of about 600 soldiers stopped the attack of Bolshevik infantry and cavalry with a force of about 2,000 throughout the whole day on the Hill 385 near the village of Dytiatyn. At the end of the clash, one infantry platoon from the 13th Infantry Regiment and the remaining artillery under the command of Cpt. Adam Zając defended to the last man. The protagonist's attitude of the defenders allowed time to regroup Polish-Ukrainian troops near the city of Halych, which without the protection of 13th Infantry Regiment on Dytiatyn would most likely be attacked from the flanks by Bolsheviks and annihilated.
- Battle of Wizna (7–10 September 1939) – a battle fought during the September Campaign (Polish: Kampania Wrześniowa). These were 720 Polish soldiers under the command of Władysław Raginis who took a famous last stand against 42,200 German soldiers with 350 tanks, 457 mortars, cannon, grenade launchers and 600 Luftwaffe aircraft; the ratio roughly works out to one Polish soldier per sixty Germans and one aircraft. Only a few Polish soldiers were taken into captivity; the rest were killed fighting to the end, while the commanding officer kept his oath to die rather than surrender. When his soldiers ran out of ammunition, Raginis ordered his remaining men to surrender while he remained at the command post and committed suicide by detonating a hand grenade.
