= 8th Lithuanian Cavalry Regiment =

8th Lithuanian Vanguard Regiment
- Active: 1794-1795
- Country: Grand Duchy of Lithuania
- Type: Cavalry
- Garrison/HQ: Wizna (1794 Oct)
- Engagements: Kościuszko Uprising

The 8th Lithuanian Cavalry Regiment (Polish: 8 Pułk Jazdy Wielkiego Księstwa Litewskiego) was a military unit of the Grand Duchy of Lithuania, raised during the Kościuszko Uprising.

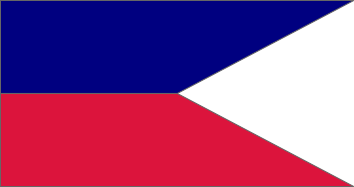
8th Lithuanian Cavalry Regiment Flag

== History ==
=== Origins ===
Formed in 1794 from Gen. Andrzej Karwowski's unit.

=== Kościuszko Uprising ===
The unit partook in the battle of Magnuszew. In October 1794, the regiment was stationed in Wizna.

== Commanders ==
During the regiment's whole existence, it was commanded by Mjr. Józef Weyssenhoff.
