= Łagiewniki =

Łagiewniki may refer to:

- Divine Mercy Sanctuary (Kraków), commonly known as the Łagiewniki
- Łagiewniki, Kościan County, in Greater Poland Voivodeship (west-central Poland)
- Łagiewniki, Krotoszyn County, in Greater Poland Voivodeship (west-central Poland)
- Łagiewniki, Poznań County, in Greater Poland Voivodeship (west-central Poland)
- Łagiewniki, Gmina Grodziec, in Greater Poland Voivodeship (west-central Poland)
- Łagiewniki, Gmina Sompolno, in Greater Poland Voivodeship (west-central Poland)
- Łagiewniki, Gmina Suchy Las, in Greater Poland Voivodeship (west-central Poland)
- Łagiewniki, Inowrocław County, in Kuyavian-Pomeranian Voivodeship (north-central Poland)
- Łagiewniki, Włocławek County, in Kuyavian-Pomeranian Voivodeship (north-central Poland)
- Łagiewniki, Radomsko County, in Łódź Voivodeship (central Poland)
- Łagiewniki, Sieradz County, in Łódź Voivodeship (central Poland)
- Łagiewniki, Wieluń County, in Łódź Voivodeship (central Poland)
- Łagiewniki, Lower Silesian Voivodeship, (south-west Poland)
- Łagiewniki, Lublin Voivodeship, (east Poland)
- Łagiewniki, Masovian Voivodeship, (east-central Poland)
- Łagiewniki, Busko County, in Świętokrzyskie Voivodeship (south-central Poland)
- Łagiewniki, Kielce County, in Świętokrzyskie Voivodeship (south-central Poland)
- Łagiewniki, West Pomeranian Voivodeship, (north-west Poland)
- Łagiewniki (Bytom), a district of the city of Bytom
- Łagiewniki (Kraków), a district of the city of Kraków
- Łagiewniki (Łódź), a district of the city of Łódź
- Łagiewniki, part of the Łagiewniki-Borek Fałęcki district of Kraków
