= Wizna =

Village in Podlaskie Voivodeship, Poland

- Village
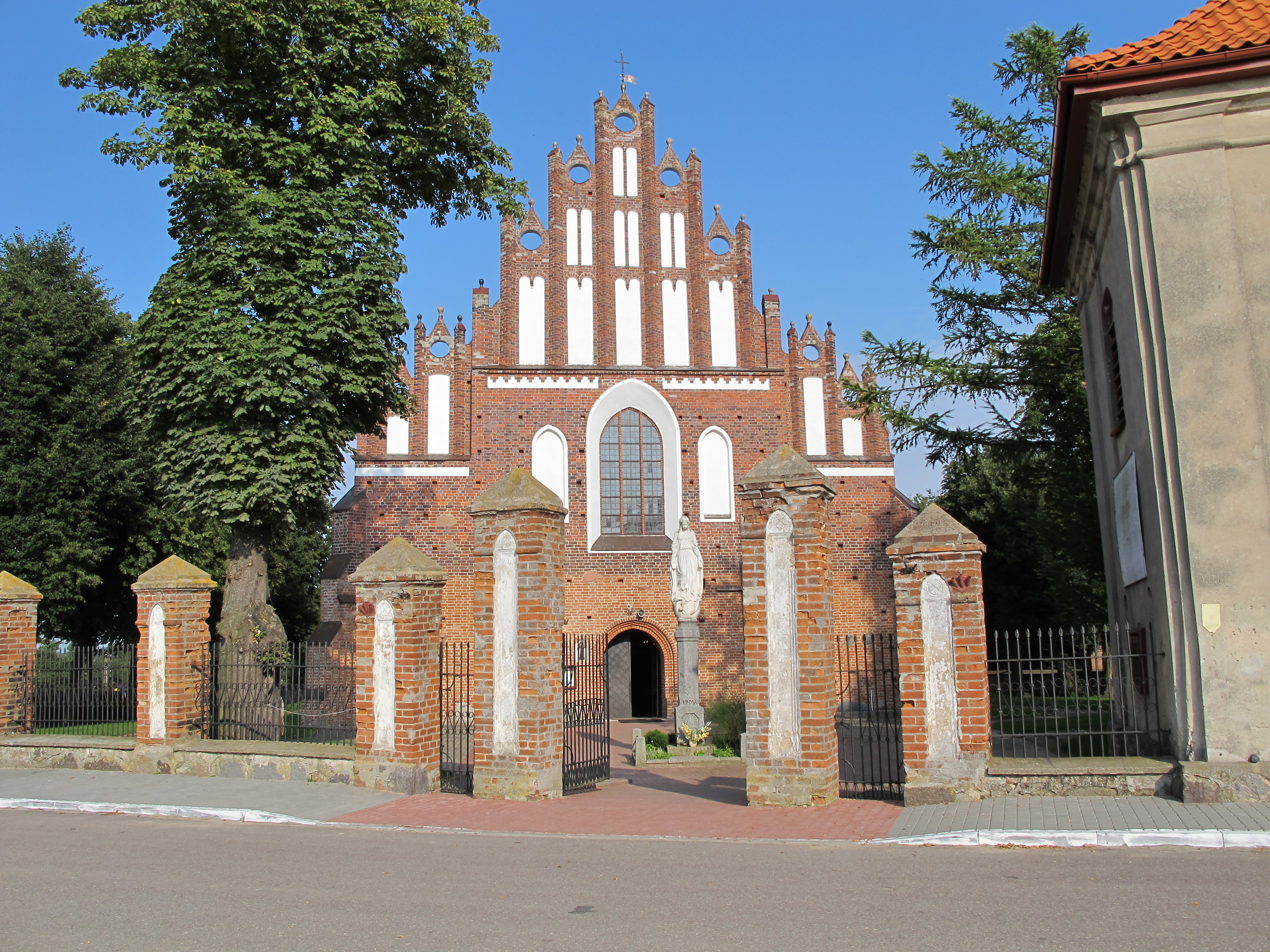
- Gothic Saint John the Baptist church in Wizna

- Location within Poland
- Coordinates: 53°12′N 22°23′E
- Country: Poland
- Voivodeship: Podlaskie
- County: Łomża
- Gmina: Wizna

Population
  - Total: 1,300
- Time zone: UTC+1 (CET)
  - Summer (DST): UTC+2 (CEST)
- Postal code: 18-430
- Vehicle registration: BLM
- Website: http://wizna.pl/

Wizna [ˈvizna] is a village in Łomża County of Podlaskie Voivodeship, in north-eastern Poland, situated on the Narew River. Wizna is known for the battle of Wizna which took place in its vicinity during the 1939 Invasion of Poland at the start of World War II.

Farming and food production are the primary sources of income for the residents. The food production by private farms provides favorable conditions for the development of processing industry.

== History ==
=== Early history ===
Wizna has a remarkably rich history. As early as the 11th century there was a castle there, watching over the eastern border of Masovia and an important river crossing of the Narew river. From the mid 12th century the town was a registered office of the castellany, and from 1379 the capital of the Wizna Land within Masovia, Poland. The Catholic Parish in Wizna was established in 1390.

Wizna was built on an important trade route from Lithuania (within the Polish–Lithuanian union) to Kraków. The Queen of Poland, Anna the Jagiellonian used to travel through the town and so did Queen Bona Sforza. From 1435 to 1870, over four centuries, Wizna was one of the most important cities of north-eastern Masovia. It was a royal town of Poland and seat of the Wizna County and Wizna Land in the Masovian Voivodeship in the Greater Poland Province. Its significance began to decline only with the development of the nearby town of Łomża.

=== Late modern period ===
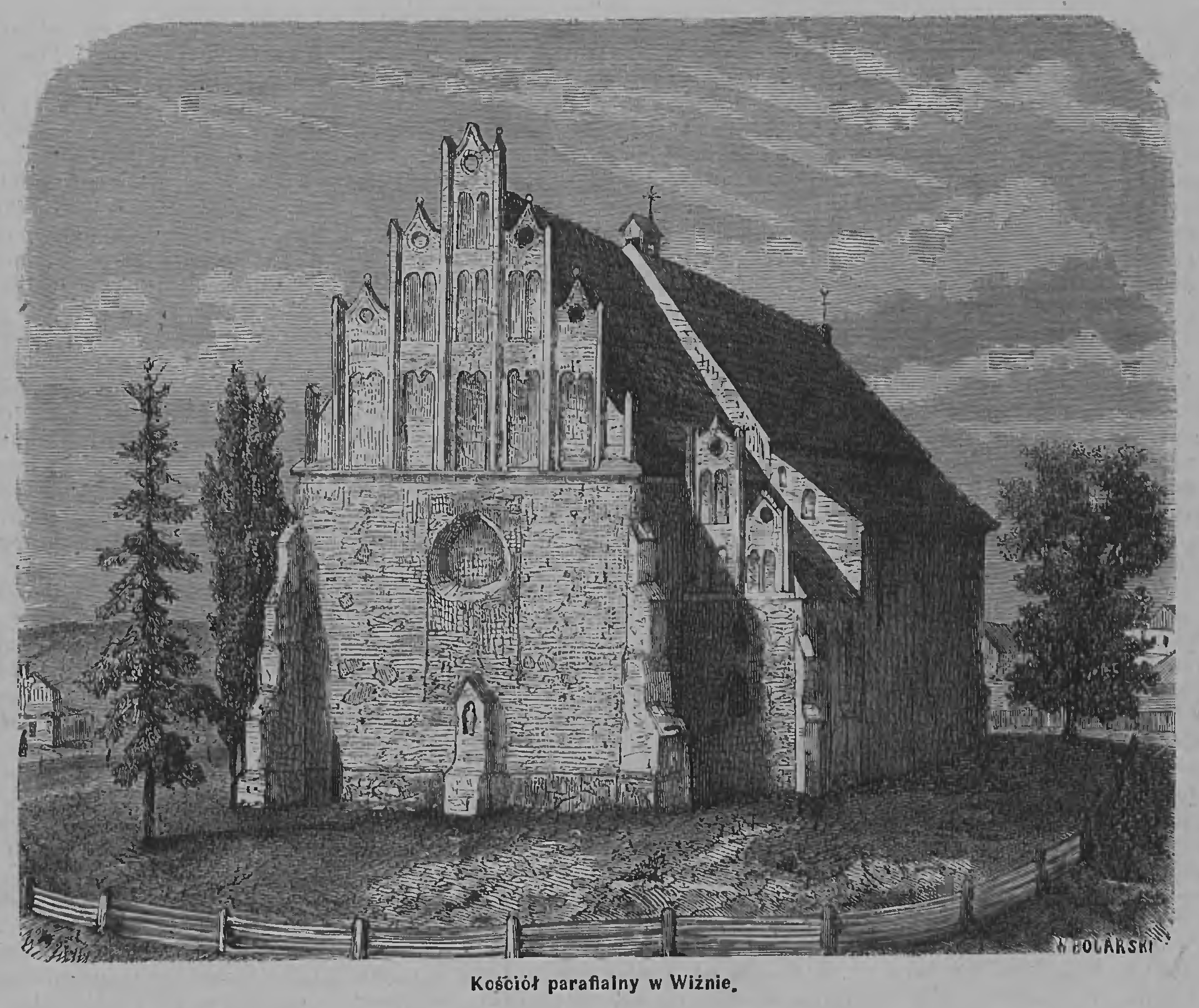
19th-century drawing of the church in Wizna

In the Third Partition of Poland in 1795, Wizna was annexed by Prussia. In 1807, it was regained by Poles and included within the short-lived Polish Duchy of Warsaw After its dissolution in 1815, fell to the Russian Partition of Poland. Administratively it was located in the Augustów Voivodeship, which was renamed to Augustów Governorate in 1837. In 1860 Wizna had 2,573 residents. In October 1861, due to Polish protests in various places throughout the country, the Russians imposed martial law. Afterwards the Polish resistance began preparations for an uprising. One of the organizers of the uprising in the Augustów Governorate was Rafał Błoński, son of the mayor of Wizna. In 1863 the January Uprising broke out, many local Poles joined it, and insurgents operated in the area. Ludwik Krajewski, commander of a small insurgent unit, was captured by the Russians in Wizna and hanged, and then his body was dragged through the streets of the town to deter others from joining the uprising. The Russians also carried out deportations to Siberia, arrests and executions of local people. In 1870, Wizna was one of many Polish towns deprived of town rights by the Russian administration as punishment for the January Uprising.

Following World War I, in 1918, Poland regained independence and control of the settlement. In the interwar period the population numbers rose to over 3,300 partly due to influx of new Jewish immigrants from the neighboring states.

=== Jews in Wizna ===
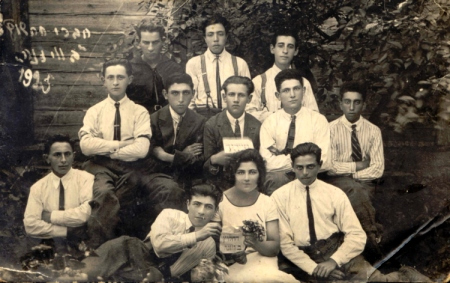
Members of the Hachalutz youth movement in Wizna, 1925

It is not clear when Jews started to settle in Wizna. Most of the Jewish population lived around the Rynek (Town Square) and the nearby streets. In 1765, 16 Jewish families (about 75 individuals) lived in Wizna. In 1857, there were 492 Jews out of a total population of 1,861; in 1921, they numbered 714 out of 2,670. Jews were mostly small merchants, craftsman and service providers. In the small village of Witkowo, on the Narew River adjacent to the north side of Wizna, a few Jewish families were farmers and fishermen. These included the Gostkowski family, which had operated a ferry on the Narew River for over 100 years prior to the construction of the bridge on the road between Łomża and Bialystok. Urke Nachalnik was born in Wizna to the Farberowicz family, who were grain merchants and operated a flour mill. Nachalnik's books and stories were published in several languages by the Yiddish press in Poland and in the United States in the 1930s, and some were turned into stage plays.

==== Zionist activity in Wizna ====
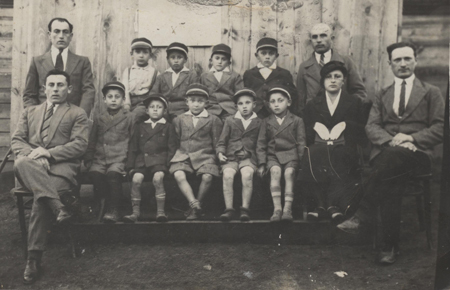
The Tarbut Hebrew school in Wizna in the 1930s

Zionist parties were active in Wizna during the 1920s and 1930s. A Hebrew school called Tarbut was opened, and there were active Zionist youth movements - Hashomer Hatzair and Hachalutz. On the eve of World War II, Jews from Wizna emigrated to the US, Cuba, Argentina and Australia. Members of the Zionist youth movements emigrated to pre-State Israel and founded kibbutzim: Ramat Hakovesh, Einat, Yagur, Givat Hashlosha, Kfar Menachem, Ifat, Evron and Gvat. In addition former Wizners settled in Rishon Lezion, Tel-Aviv, Haifa, Jerusalem, Kfar Saba, Kfar Sirkin, Kiryat Haim, Petah Tikva, Ramat-Gan, Holon, Ganei Hadar, Ramat Zvi, Nahariya, Tel-Mond and elsewhere.

=== World War II ===
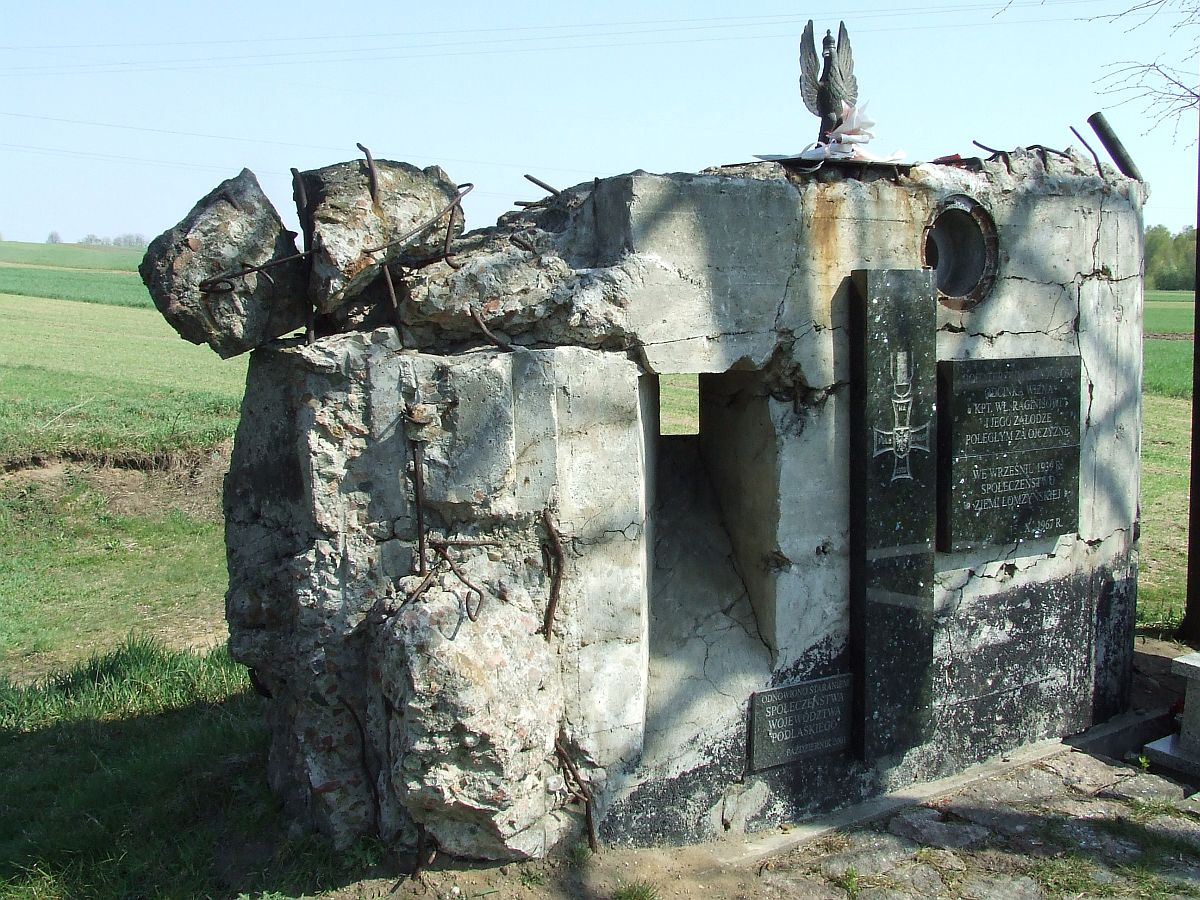
Ruins of one of the Polish defense bunkers, now a memorial site

Wizna is known as the Polish Thermopylae. It was the site of the Battle of Wizna (September 7–10, 1939) during the initial stages of the German Invasion of Poland which started World War II. The Polish defense force consisted of approximately 700 soldiers and 20 officers armed with six pieces of heavy artillery. They held a fortified territory against a vastly larger invading force at great cost of lives, before being annihilated with no known survivors. Heavy German assault on the Polish bunkers continued for three days and was successfully repelled until the early morning of September 10. The German engineers with the help of tanks and explosives managed to destroy all but two of the Polish bunkers. Both of them were located in the centre of Góra Strękowa, and although much of the crew was wounded or incapacitated and most of the machine guns destroyed, resistance continued to the end. It is said that General Heinz Guderian threatened the Polish commander, Captain Władysław Raginis with the shooting of POWs if the remaining force did not surrender. The symbol of Polish will, Władysław Raginis, committed suicide by throwing himself on a grenade. German losses are not known. In his diaries Heinz Guderian noted that 900 German soldiers were killed in action, although that number is probably an underestimation. It is certain, however, that the Wehrmacht lost at least 10 tanks and several other AFVs in the struggle. Afterwards, the settlement was handed over by Germany to the Soviet Union in accordance with the Molotov–Ribbentrop Pact. It was under Soviet occupation until 1941, when it fell under German occupation following Operation Barbarossa. Polish partisans of the Home Army launched two attacks on a German gendarmerie post in Wizna, in May 1943 and on 22 May 1944.

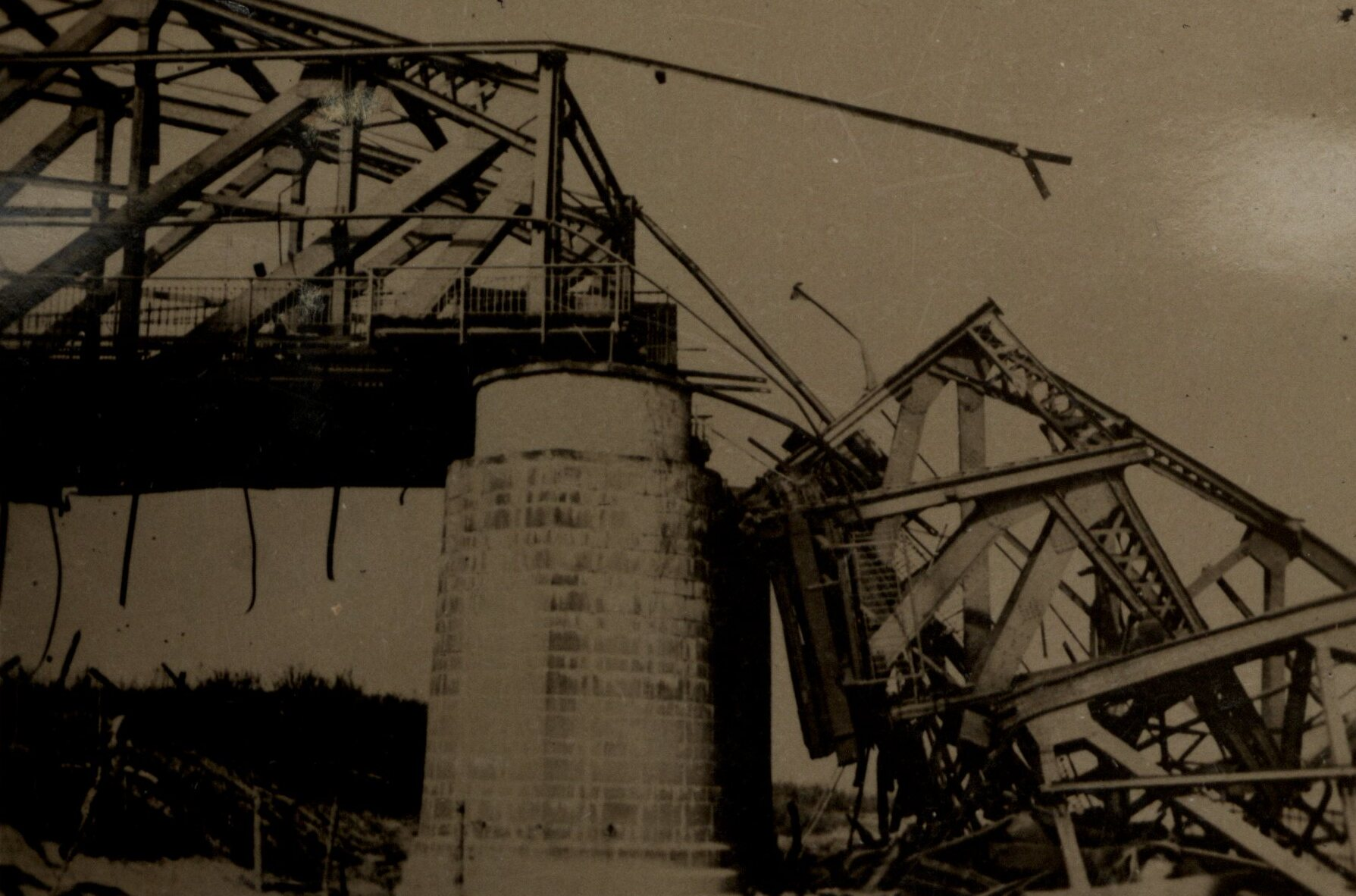
Destroyed bridge in Wizna during the invasion of Poland in September 1939

==== The Holocaust ====
On 22 June 1941, during Operation Barbarossa, most of the houses of Wizna's 600 Jews were burned down following an aerial bombardment. Five German soldiers arrived on 24 June 1941, and local Poles killed three Jews on the same day. Jews fled the town, and local Polish collaborators searched for them in the surrounding villages and turned them over to the Germans after beating them and their Polish helpers. On 26 June, local Poles locked 20 Jews up in a smithy and a German threw in hand grenades, killing them all. Most of the town's Jews returned by early July, and dozens were killed by the Germans. The Polish mayor ordered the expulsion of the Jews. Some fled to Łomża and a group of 200-240 sought refuge in Jedwabne. Many perished on 10 July 1941 in the Jedwabne pogrom.

== See also ==
- Battle of Wizna, with map
- Battle of Zadwórze
- Battle of Westerplatte
