= Battle of Dytiatyn =

Coordinates: 49°14′28″N 24°52′40″E

- Part of Polish–Bolshevik War
Date	16th September 1920
Location	Dytiatyn
Result	Soviet victory

Belligerents
Second Polish Republic	(Russian Soviet Federative Socialist Republic) Russian SFSR

Commanders and leaders
Jan Rudolf Gabryś	Vitaly Primakov

Units involved
3rd battalion of the 13th Infantry Regiment, artillery	8th Cavalry Division, 123rd Rifle Brigade

Strength
~600 soldiers, 6 guns, 6 heavy machine guns	~1,200 sabers, 1,000 bayonets, 5 guns, 20 machine guns

Casualties and losses
97 killed, 86 wounded	Unknown

Battle of Dytiatyn was one of battles of the Polish–Soviet War of 1919–1921 also one of the battles that have been called the Polish Thermopylae. It took place on 16 September 1920 between units of the 8th Polish Field Artillery Regiment from Płock and the 8th Mounted Red Cossack Division of the Red Army near the village of Dytiatyn (now in Ukraine, northwest of Halicz).

The Poles defended themselves on a grassy hill 383 m (1,257 ft) above sea level but after they ran out of ammunition they were massacred by some 3,500 Soviet mounted troops. The 'Red Cossacks' murdered 97 Poles and an additional number of wounded Poles were killed after the battle. Among the dead was the commandant of the regiment Colonel Wladyslaw Domanski. Altogether on that day some 240 Poles died. The 8th Mounted Red Cossack Division of the Red Army was destroyed a few days later near Tarnopol.

In the interbellum period, Polish military authorities established a cemetery and a monument to the massacred soldiers. It was completely destroyed after the Soviet invasion of Poland in September 1939.
