= Fortified Area of Silesia =

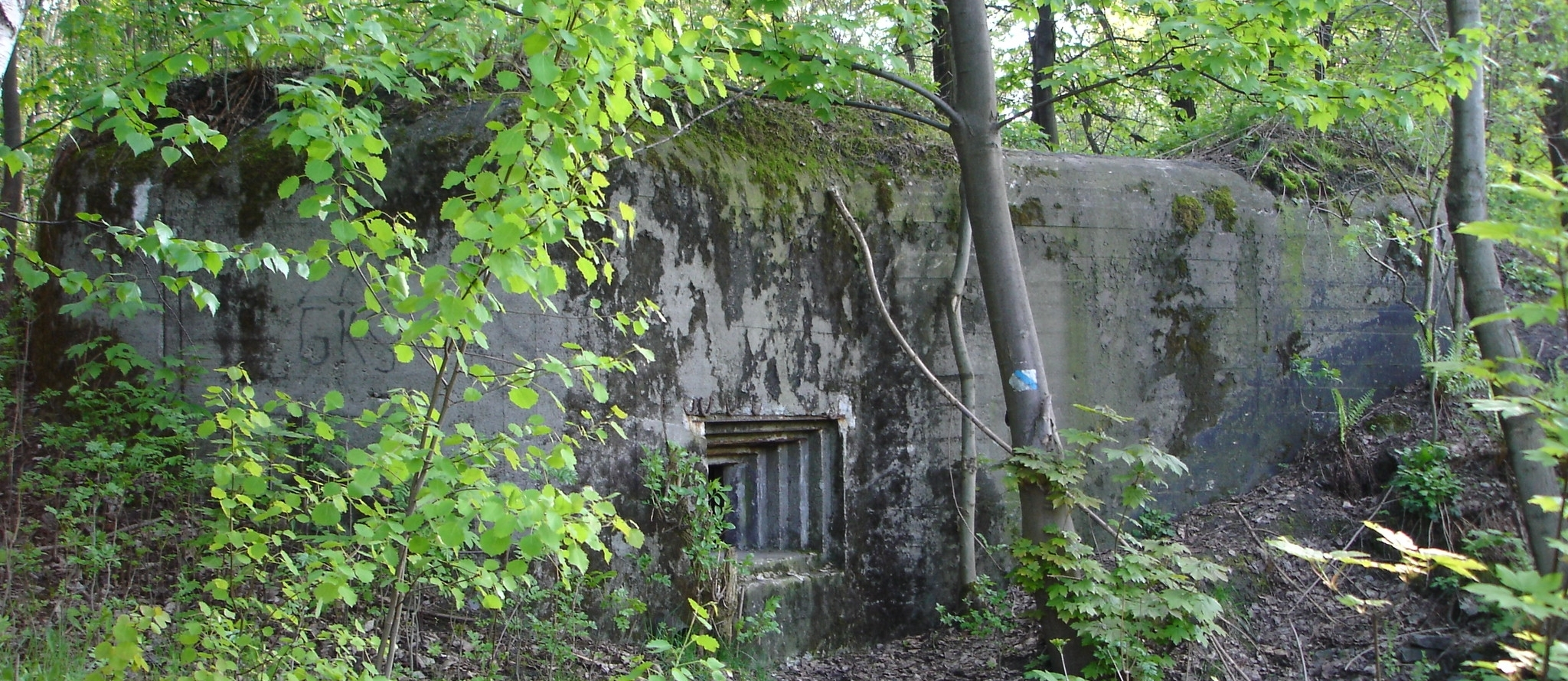
Polish bunker near Łagiewniki, Bytom

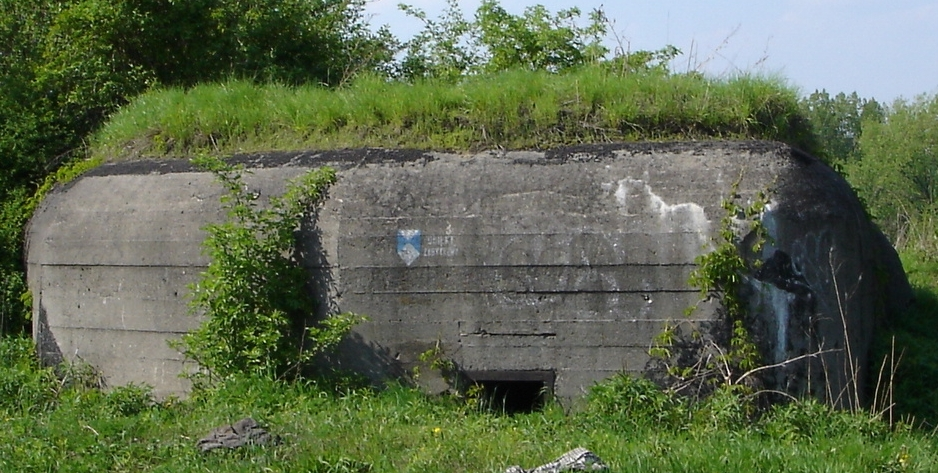
Another Polish bunker in Łagiewniki

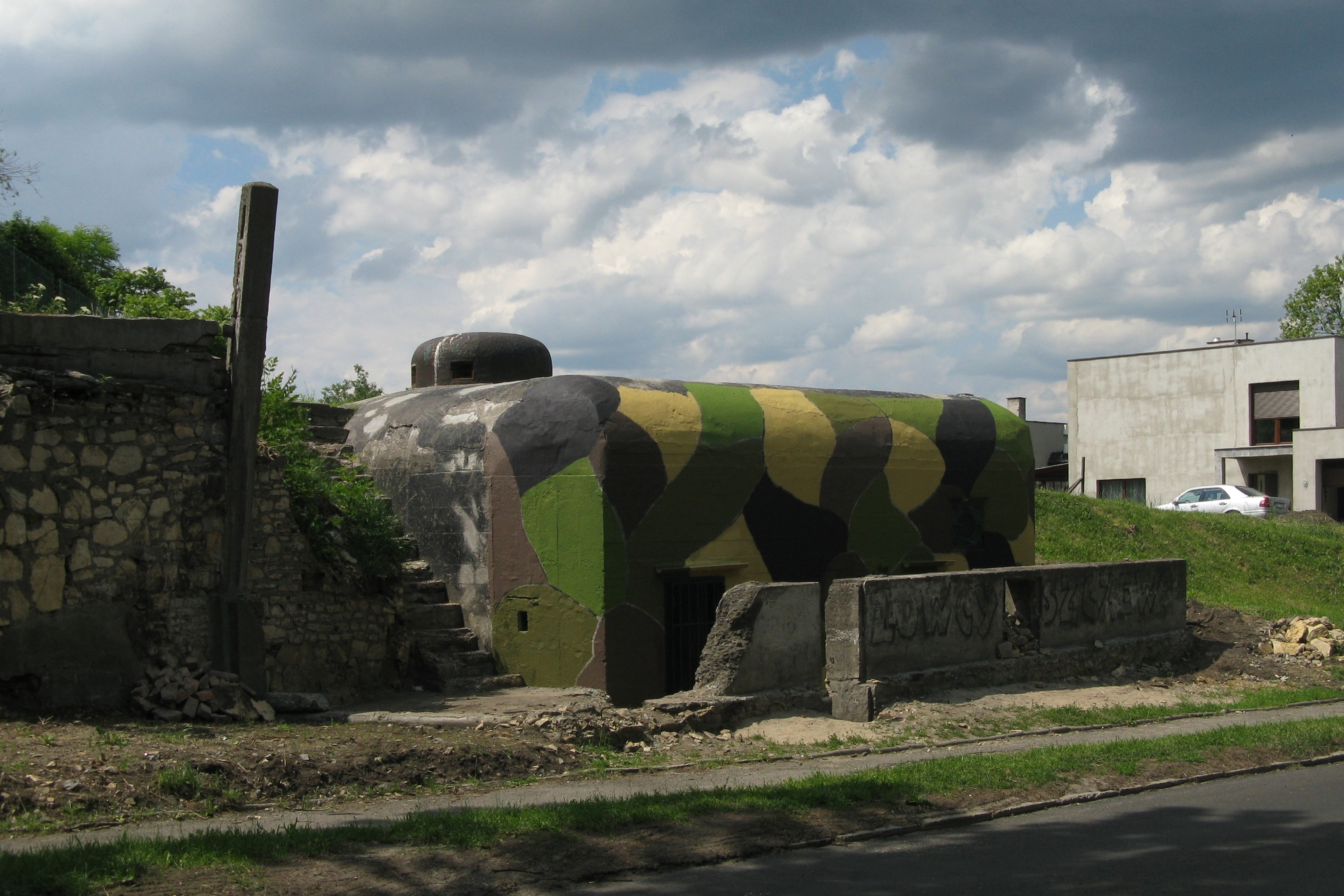
Polish bunker in Piekary Śląskie

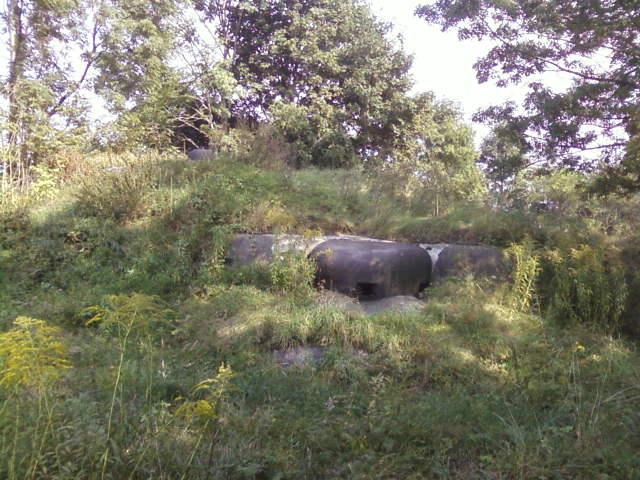
Artillery bunker in Piekary Śląskie near the Polish National Road number 94

The Fortified Area of Silesia (Polish: Obszar Warowny Śląsk) was a set of Polish fortifications, constructed along the interbellum border of Poland and Germany in the area of then-divided Upper Silesia and in the Dąbrowa Basin that is part of Lesser Poland. It spreads from the village of Przeczyce (part of the Dąbrowa Basin) in the north to the town of Wyry in the south, along the line of sixty kilometers. Headquarters of the area was placed in Chorzów and its commandant was General Jan Jagmin-Sadowski.

== History ==
As a result of the Plebiscite in Silesia and the Silesian Uprisings, the highly industrialized area of Upper Silesia, which had belonged to the German Empire, was divided between Poland and Germany, leaving Beuthen, Hindenburg and Gleiwitz in Germany and granting both Katowice and Chorzów to Poland.

In the 1920s the Poles did not consider their western neighbor as the main threat, concentrating its defence abilities in the East, along the border with the Soviet Union. However, beginning in the early 1930s, after Adolf Hitler had come to power, the Poles decided to prepare themselves for a war. Upper Silesia was the most important industrial region of the country and its defence was crucial.

== Construction ==
Major works on the fortifications did not begin until 1933, when headquarters of the Polish Army decided to take advantage of a proposal provided by General Jozef Zajac, who then was commandant of the 23rd Infantry Division. Zajac suggested that a large number of smaller bunkers should be built, connected with each other by trenches. However, it was decided that nine so-called points of defence would be constructed, each of them made of a few bunkers. These points were:

- Nowa Wieś
- Tapkowice
- Bobrowniki
- Dąbrówka Wielka
- Łagiewniki
- Godula
- Hill 319 - west of Nowy Bytom
- Szyb Artura
- Hill 304 - south of Radoszów.

All fortifications were divided into three parts:

- A - Bobrowniki
- B - Chorzów
- C - Kochłowice

=== First stage ===
Between 1933 and 1935, the Poles constructed three isolated points of defence - Dąbrowka Wielka (1933), Szyb Artura (1934) and Bobrowniki (1935). Altogether, they consisted of around 25 bunkers. Strategically placed on hills, these fortifications provided good view of the area.

=== Second stage ===
The second stage began in 1936, when the Poles completed the point of defence in Bobrowniki, together with barracks. In that year, construction crews activities were concentrated on the so-called Bytom wedge - German territory around the city of Beuthen, which was surrounded from east, south and north by Poland. In 1936 the strongest point of defence was located in the settlement of Łagiewniki. It was connected with additional, smaller points - Kamień, Brzeziny and Maciejowice, which created a continuous line of defence.

In 1937 the Poles began construction of fortifications in the city of Ruda Śląska, creating points of defence Godula, Nowy Bytom and Radoszowy. Barracks were built as well as munitions depots and guardrooms.

Simultaneously to concrete constructions, Polish Army was carrying out hydrotechnological works. Between 1935 and 1937, on the northern wing of the area, along the Brynica, a set of dams, ponds, swamps and canals was created, whose purpose was to stop the advance of German armored units. This line stretched from Piekary Śląskie to Świerklaniec near Tarnowskie Góry.

=== 1939 ===
In the early spring of 1939, when German troops occupied Bohemia, the Poles realised that the Fortified Area Silesia might be bypassed from the south. Therefore, around Mikołów, new works began, but they never were completed. During Polish September Campaign, the advancing Wehrmacht did not attack Polish fortified positions directly; instead the Germans broke Polish defence west of Częstochowa and deep in the south. Units of the Polish Army left their positions in Upper Silesia on September 3, 1939 and withdrew towards the east.

== Aftermath ==
Currently, the preserved fortifications are under care of the Society to Preserve Fortified Monuments Pro Fortalicium (Stowarzyszenie na Rzecz Zabytków Fortyfikacji Pro Fortalicium) from Piekary Śląskie.

== See also ==
- Sarny Fortified Area
- Hel Fortified Area
