= Władysław Raginis =

Polish military commander (1908–1939)

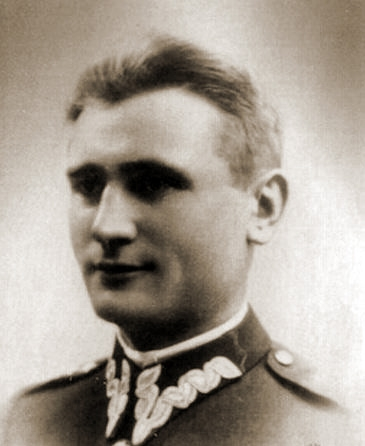
- Captain Władysław Raginis
- Born: June 27, 1908 "Zariņi", Salanāja Parish, Courland Governorate, Russian Empire (now near, Saliena Parish, Augšdaugava Municipality, Latvia)
- Died: September 10, 1939 (aged 31); Strękowa Góra near Wizna, Poland
- Military career
- Branch: Border Defense Corps (KOP)
- Service years: 1930–1939
- Rank: Captain
- Units: Regiment "Sarny"
- Commands: CO of Polish forces in Wizna
- Conflicts: World War II: Polish Defensive War; Battle of Wizna †
- Awards: Virtuti Militari (Gold Cross) Polonia Restituta (Grand Cross)

Władysław Raginis (June 27, 1908 – September 10, 1939) was a Polish military commander during the invasion of Poland in 1939. He commanded a small force holding the Polish fortified defense positions against a vastly larger German force during the Battle of Wizna. Because the positions were held at great cost for three days before being annihilated with few survivors, Wizna is referred to as the Polish Thermopylae and Captain Raginis as a modern Leonidas.

== Background ==
Raginis was born in the Zariņi (Zariny) homestead of the Jaunborne (Neu-Born) Manor near Dźwińsk (Daugavpils), Courland Governorate, Russian Empire (present-day Jaunborne, Saliena Parish, Augšdaugava Municipality, Latvia) to a landowning family with patriotic traditions. Soon after graduating from a Vilnius gymnasium in 1927, he joined the Infantry NCO School in Komorowo near Ostrów Mazowiecka where he was a mediocre student and completed his studies in 1928. He then completed a short practice of the military and the same year he enrolled at the Infantry Officers School in Ostrów Mazowiecka. One of his schoolmates recalled:

"He had a borderland accent, and was quiet and shy. Slim, small, blond hair .... "

After graduating on July 15, 1930, he was assigned to the 76th Infantry Regiment stationed in Grodno, where he was a platoon commander and instructor-lecturer at the School Cadet Corps. In 1939, as a distinction, he was advanced to lieutenant and then to captain and assigned to the elite Border Defence Corps (KOP) as the commander of the 3rd company, heavy machine gun battalion, of the Border Defence Corps Regiment "Sarny" under the command of Lt-Colonel Nikodem Sulik.

In the late summer of 1939, the "Sarny" Regiment sent the bulk of its forces to Upper Silesia to man the Fortified Area Silesia, some units, including Raginis, instead went to Osowiec Fortress, near the border with East Prussia.

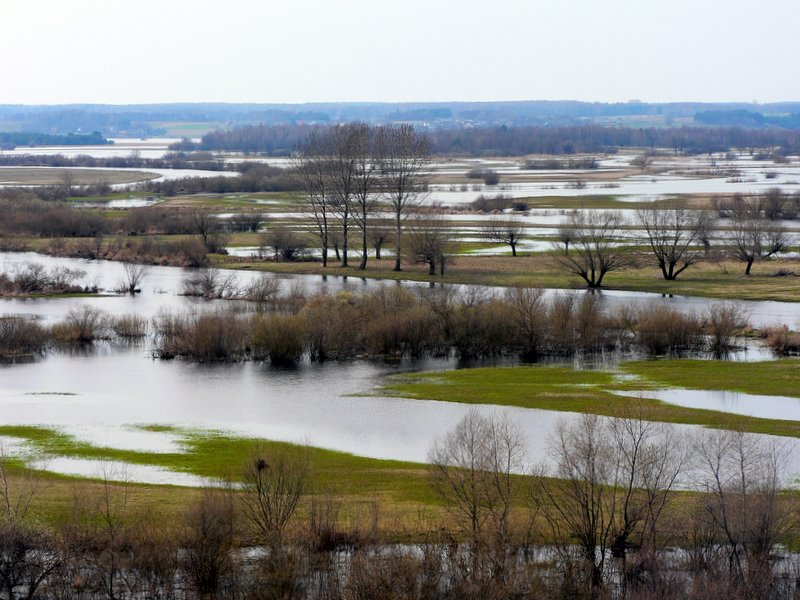
Wizna Battlefield overlooking Narew River near Góra Strękowa

In anticipation of the outbreak of the Second World War, on September 2, 1939, Major Jakub Fober gave Raginis command of all the Wizna Fortified Area, a buffer of 9 kilometres (5.6 miles) between the Narew River and Biebrza River, which was part of defensive line of Independent Operational Group "Narew" on the right wing of Polish forces. "Wizna" secured a major artery of communication, the Łomża – Białystok road and the Zambrów – Osowiec railway.

It is worth noting that some of the shelters were incomplete as war broke out, some had little to no ventilation, many of them not camouflaged and some were not fitted with armored observation domes. The incomplete state of the shelters significantly reduced the combat capability of the emplacements.

== The battle of Wizna ==
On September 7, Raginis' forces (approximately 720 men, out of which roughly 650 were killed) were attacked by more than 42,000 German soldiers. To keep the morale of his men high, Raginis pledged that he would not leave his post alive.

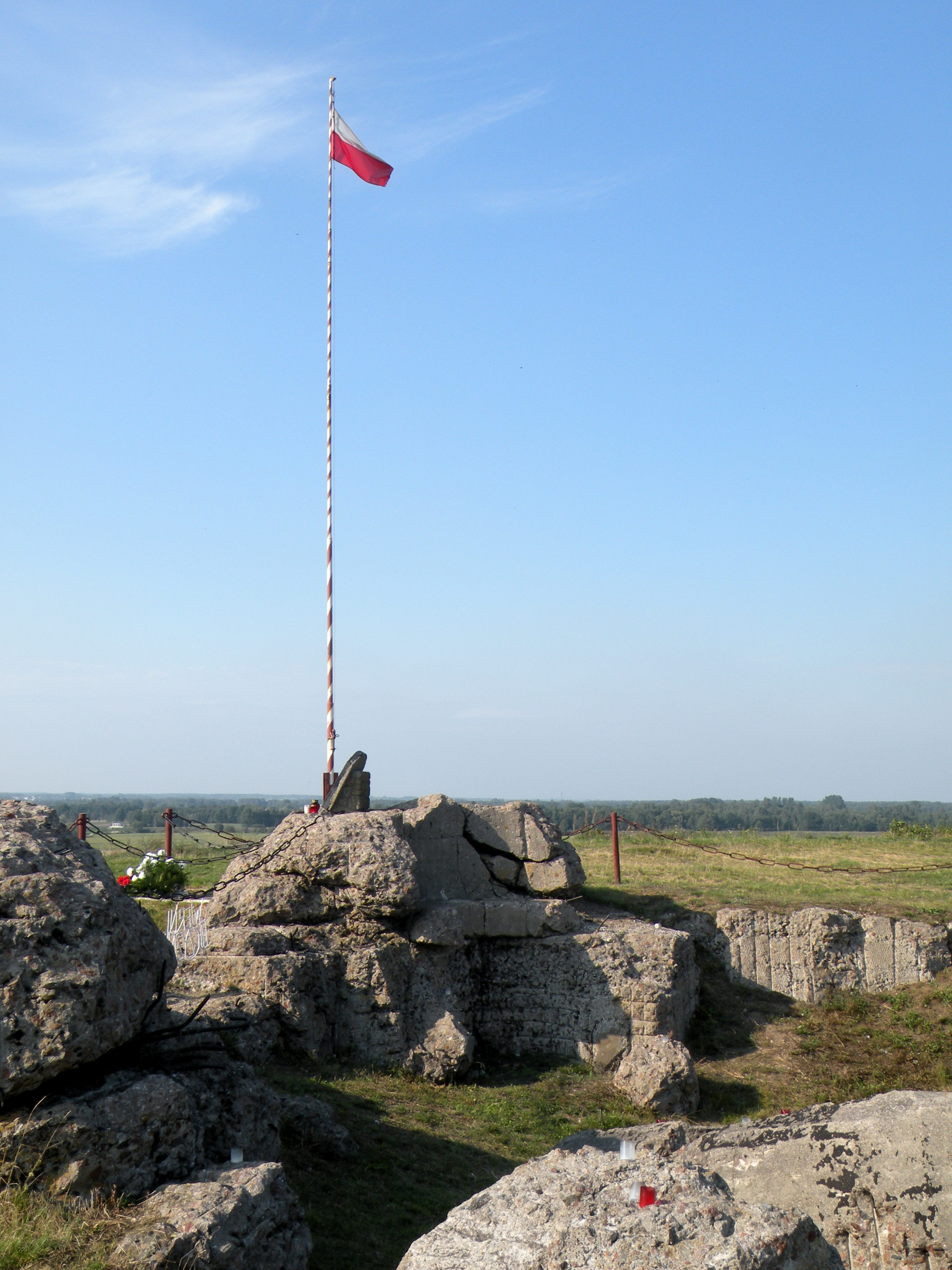
Monument to Władysław Raginis near Góra Strękowa

The defense of Wizna against overwhelming odds lasted for three days. On September 10, 1939, the bunker commanded by Raginis was the last remaining pocket of resistance. Although heavily wounded, Raginis was still commanding his troops. At noon on the third day, the German commander, Heinz Guderian, threatened that all Polish POWs would be shot if the defense of the bunker did not cease. Turning to his men in the shelter, Raginis thanked them for their bravery, and for doing their duty. He then ordered them to surrender and leave the shelter - he would keep his word and not surrender. Seweryn Biegański, who was the last to leave the shelter, describes the moment;

"The captain looked at me warmly and softly urged me to leave. When I was at the exit, I was hit on my back with strong gust and I heard an explosion."

Raginis decided to end the resistance and died by suicide by throwing himself on a grenade.

In his diaries, Guderian noted that 900 German soldiers were killed in action, although that number is probably a low estimate. It is certain, however, that the Wehrmacht lost at least 10 tanks and several other AFVs in the struggle.

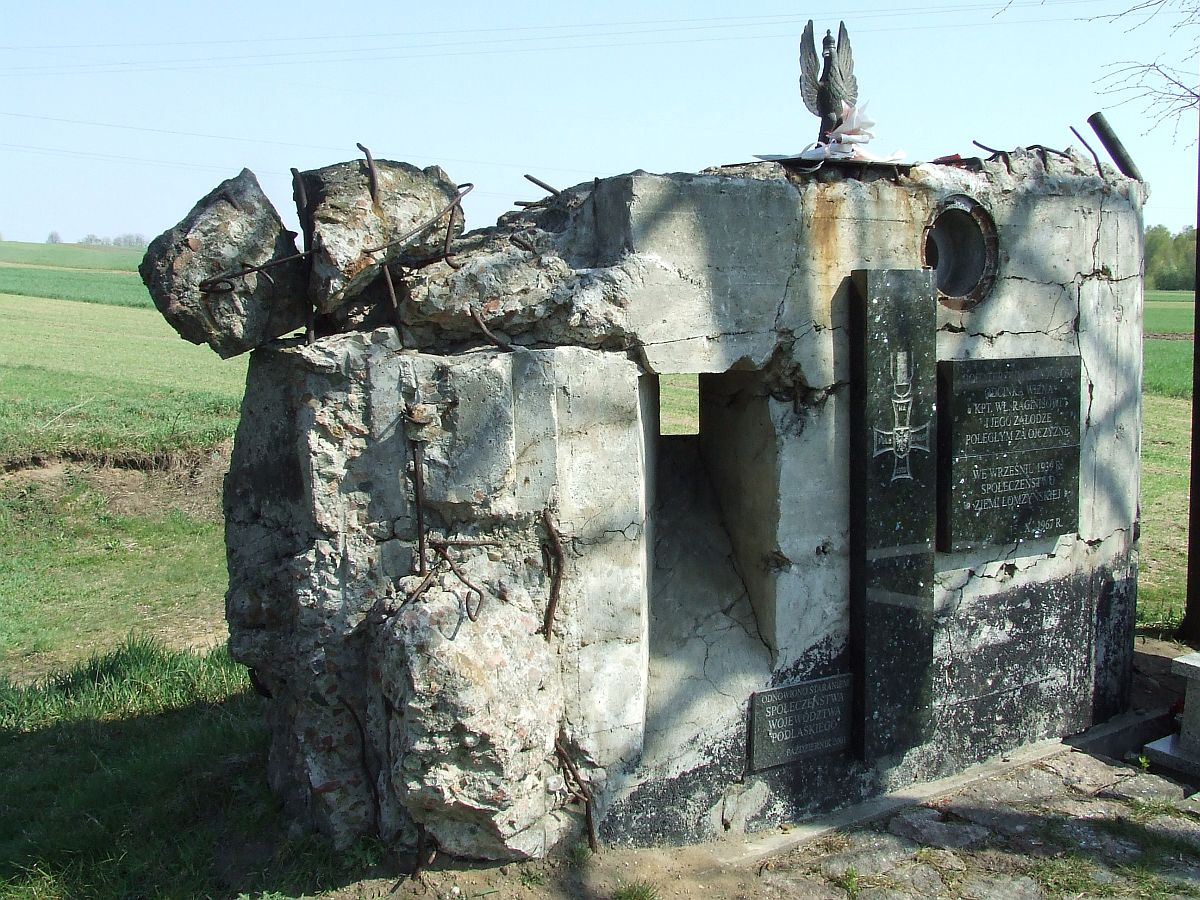
Ruins of one of the bunkers, now a memorial site

The defense of Wizna, despite the clear imbalance of forces, of which the defenders were aware, was significant. It had pinned down the German forces for two days, allowing the remnants of Polish troops in western Poland to defend the capital, Warsaw. It helped gain time for many Polish units and the government leadership to conduct an orderly withdrawal to the Romanian bridgehead (Polish: Przedmoście rumuńskie).

The Germans agreed to allow burial of the corpses of Raginis and Lieutenant Stanisław Brykalski by Kazimierz Puchowicz, a friend of Raginis, next to the bunker where a tree was planted as an impromptu memorial. When the Red Army entered Wizna, the Soviet authorities ordered the bodies to be dug up and moved next to the Łomża - Białystok road, where an obelisk stands today. His symbolic grave is located next to the ruins of the bunker in which he died.

The inscription on the monument tablet says;

Przechodniu, powiedz Ojczyźnie, żeśmy walczyli do końca, spełniając swój obowiązek

which translates into English as:

Passerby, tell the Fatherland that we fought to the end, fulfilling our duty

(In the style of the epitaph for the soldiers at Thermopylae). The family of Raginis was officially notified of his death in Wizna three years later in 1943 when his sister, Maria Morawska, received a notice through the Red Cross.

== Posthumous honors ==
The local primary school is named after him, as well as several streets in Poland, including one in Białystok, Rzeszów and Warsaw.

The 31st Council of the Polish Scouting Association in Białystok, chose Raginis as their patron in 1969.

On May 13, 1970, Raginis was posthumously awarded, by the Council of State of the Polish People's Republic, with the Virtuti Militari - Gold Cross (IV Class) medal.

On August 28, 2009, he was posthumously awarded, by the President of Poland, with the Order of Polonia Restituta (Grand Cross).

On August 21, 2012, Raginis was posthumously promoted, by the Minister of National Defence Tomasz Siemoniak to the rank of Major.

A monument to Raginis was unveiled next to the Jozef Pilsudski Daugavpils State Polish Gymnasium Primary School building on Marijas iela 1e during the visit of the Marshal of the Sejm Stanisław Karczewski to Daugavpils on 10 September 2019.

== Cultural references ==
The heroic struggle and death of Raginis has inspired a number of films and videos:

- Film documentary titled "Wierność" (1969) written and directed by Grzegorz Królikiewicz.
- Film documentary titled "Dzwony znad Wizny" (1969) directed by Franciszek Burdzy
- Television documentary series episode from TVP titled "Było... nie minęło" first broadcast on September 25, 2010.
- The image of Raginis is included on a stamp in the series "Polish Defense War of 1939" issued by Poczta Polska in 1989 to commemorate the 50th anniversary of the invasion of Poland and the outbreak of World War II.
- The Swedish power metal band Sabaton wrote the song "40:1" about the battle of Wizna, extolling the performance of the Polish defenders. Before their concert in Poland, on October 23, 2008 the members of Sabaton visited Wizna to pay their respects to the soldiers and Raginis.
