= Urke Nachalnik =

Polish gangster and writer (1897–1939)

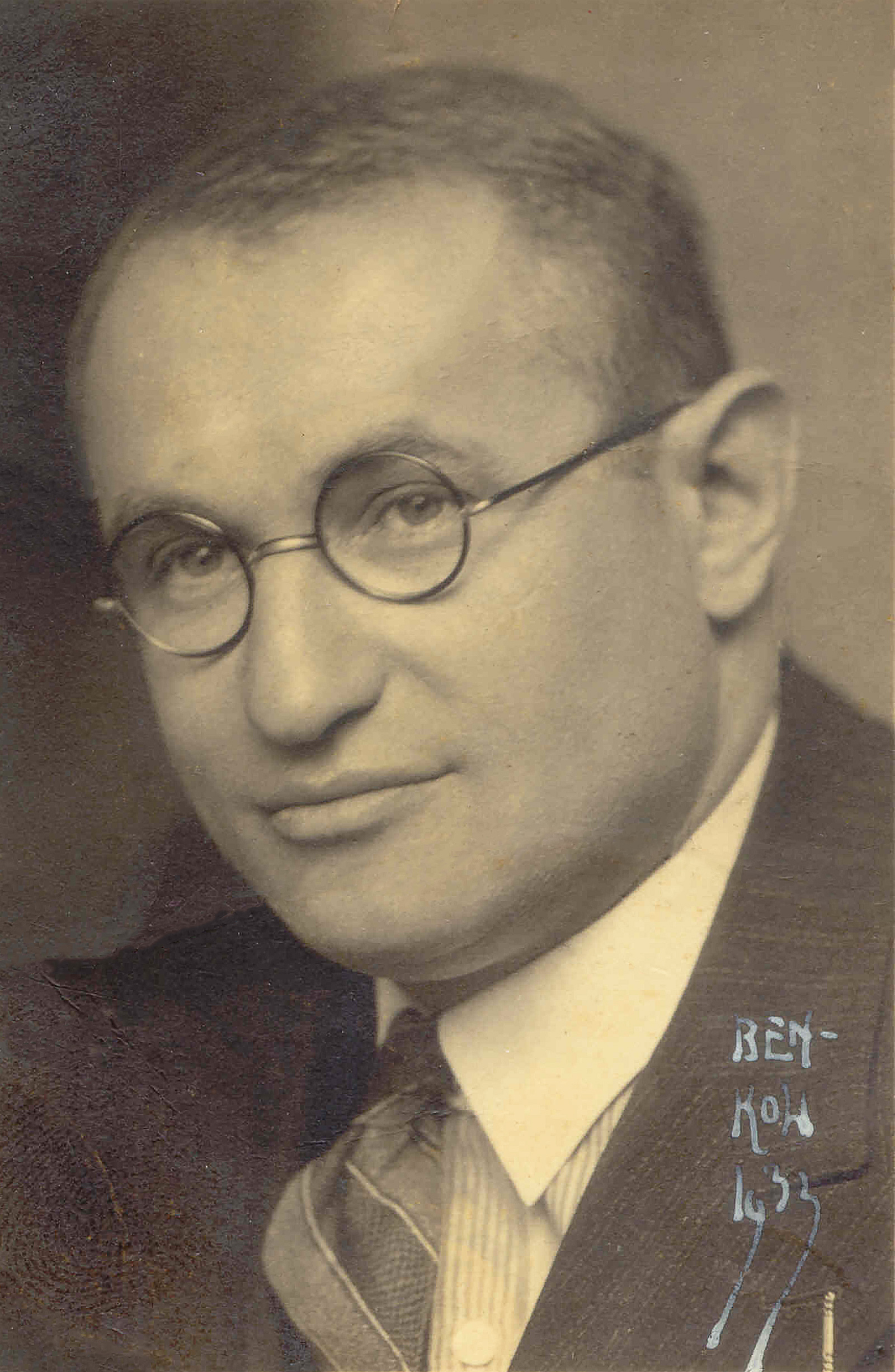
estimated to 1935, in Poland

Urke Nachalnik (Yiddish: אורקע נאכאלניק) (June, 1897 – November 11, 1939).

Itzchak Baruch Farbarowicz, better known by his literary name Urke Nachalnik, a Yeshiva boy who was born to a well to do Jewish family in Wizna, (a village near the town of Łomża, Poland), became a criminal and then a self made author and ended his life heroically on November 11 of 1939 as a leader of a small underground unit that hid Tora scrolls from destruction. The memoir of Calel Perechodnik claims that Nachalnik was among the first three victims at Otwock: he was forced to dig his own grave and then was shot along with Perechodnik's brother-in-law Wolf and Gershon Randoninski. They were buried in a Jewish cemetery and their remains were later exhumed.

His books and stories were published in Polish and Yiddish, his native tongue, and made into theater plays and serialized in newspapers.

Likewise, numerous books and articles about Polish gangsters before the Second World War include sections about Urke Nachalnik. A biographical film shown in the Discovery Historia TV channel was made about him.

== Books ==
Menshen on a morgen, Polish title: Ludzie bez jutra, Wydawnictwo Herkules, Warszawa 1938;

Życiorys własny przestępcy

Żywe grobowce, 1934.

Milosc przestępcy מיין לעבנסוועג : פון דער ישיבה און תפיסה - ביז צו דער ליטעראטור

אהבה ונקמה : רומן

Mayn lebensṿeg : fun der yeshive un tfise biz tsu der liṭeraṭur
