= Plan East =

Interwar Polish military plan to defend against Soviet attack

Plan East (Polish: Plan Wschód) was a Polish defensive military plan that was created in the 1920s and the 1930s in case of war against the Soviet Union. Unlike Plan West (Plan Zachód), it was being prepared during the whole interwar period, as the government of the Second Polish Republic treated the Soviet Union as the greatest potential military threat that was capable of initiating a full-scale war. However, only a few loose historical documents remain of the original plan today.

== Background ==
Since its establishment after World War I, the Second Polish Republic had been involved in wars and conflicts with almost all of its neighbours (see Polish-Soviet War, Polish-Ukrainian War, Polish-Lithuanian War, Greater Poland Uprising, Silesian Uprisings and Border conflicts between Poland and Czechoslovakia). However, only two of the countries were considered to be major threats: Germany and the Soviet Union.

In the 1920s and the 1930s, Polish leaders focused their efforts on countering the potential threat from the east. Fresh were memories of the Polish-Soviet War and the Battle of Warsaw, which saved Poland and the rest of Europe from the spread of the Bolshevik Revolution by force.

Since both the Polish Army and the government in Warsaw were certain that war against the Soviets was inevitable, preparations for it were far more advanced than those against Germany. It was only after 1935, when anti-Polish propaganda in Germany increased, that the German threat became visible enough for army planners to begin drawing up Plan West. Even in 1939, the number of completed fortifications in the east of Poland vastly outnumbered those in the west.

== Interbellum Polish–Soviet border ==
Poland's border with the Soviet Union was 1,412 km long. By comparison, the border with Germany, including East Prussia, was more than 20% longer, at 1,912 km. Neither border contained any major geographical obstacles, which made their defence very difficult.

In the north was flat land with huge forests such as Puszcza Nalibocka, the Wilderness of Naliboki. In addition, a major railway connecting Moscow to Western Europe extended across the northern Poland. The area's major conurbation was Wilno, in the northeast of interbellum Poland.

The centre of the country was primarily a huge sparsely populated swamp, known as Polesie. Although it had no roads and few rail lines, it had a supreme strategic importance, as its landscape allowed a prolonged, organized defense. Neither Polesie nor the adjacent Volhynia contained any major urban areas.

The south, formerly a portion of the Galicia province of Austria-Hungary, was the most highly developed area, with ita high density of rail lines, growing amount of industry (such as oil fields in Boryslaw) and well-developed agriculture of Podolia. Lwów, one of the major cities of interbellum Poland, was located in the area. In addition, the Soviet border was marked by a natural obstacle, the Zbruch River.

Virtually all Polish industrial and urban centres were in the west and so a long-lasting defence was possible, as a Soviet force would have taken up to several weeks to reach Upper Silesia, Warsaw, Kraków or Poznań.

When they developed the plan, Polish planners assumed that co-operation and support would be forthcoming from Romania, which was Poland's main eastern ally.

=== Border conflicts ===
The Soviet government undermined the validity of the Riga Peace Treaty, which it had signed in 1921, from the outset. In the early 1920s, the Soviets repeatedly organized guerrilla attacks on Polish settlements close to the border. The most famous one was the attack on Stolpce, which took place on the night of August 3–4, 1924, which prompted the creation of the Korpus Ochrony Pogranicza (Border Protection Corps). Such attacks continued throughout the 1920s but reduced in scale during the 1930s, particularly after the signing of the 1932 Soviet–Polish Non-Aggression Pact.

== Summary ==
No complete copy of the plan has been preserved. All that is known are the basic precepts, and restoring the whole plan is impossible. Work on the document was completed on February 4, 1939. The plan was based on the notions of Józef Piłsudski, who until his death in 1935 was sure that war would come from the east. Thus, most army maneuvers and field fortifications were held in the east, and Poland's western border was largely neglected. Some of the fortifications can still be seen in the area around Sarny (see Sarny Fortified Area). Bunkers built by Polish Corps of Engineers in the 1930s were used in late 1940s by the Ukrainian Insurgent Army in its guerilla skirmishes against the Soviet Red Army.

Polish planners were well aware that the Red Army was, in many ways, superior to their own. Therefore, the main idea was to organize a so-called "resistance in motion" and to try to split Soviet forces south and north of the vast Polesie swamps. Frontline armies, in the vicinity of the border, were to try to delay the advance of the aggressors and to bleed them, and reserves, mostly in the areas of Brześć nad Bugiem and Lublin, were intended to enter the conflict in its later stages.

The Poles were expecting the Red Army to advance in three directions: along the Minsk–Baranowicze–Białystok–Warsaw rail line, along the Sarny–Kowel–Lublin line and along the Tarnopol–Lwów line.

== Structure of Polish Army ==
According to the Polish historian Rajmund Szubański, in case of war in the east, the bulk of the Polish Army would be concentrated in the north and the south, with the central section of the border left mostly unguarded. Some military historians claim that Polish planners placed too many units close to the border, which would have resulted in their total destruction in the opening days of the conflict. In contrast, the rear positions were inadequately protected.

=== Frontline units ===
Seidner outlines the deployment:

- In the extreme northeast, around the rail nexus of Mołodeczno, was Armia Wilno, which possibly had three infantry divisions (1st Legions Infantry Division from Wilno, 19th Infantry Division, also from Wilno, 29th Infantry Division from Grodno), two Cavalry Brigades (Wileńska Cavalry Brigade from Wilno, Suwalska Cavalry Brigade from Suwałki), and the 5th Air Corps from Lida.
- South of Armia Wilno was Armia Baranowicze, with probably four infantry divisions (9th Infantry Division from Siedlce, 20th Infantry Division from Baranowicze, 18th Infantry Division from Łomża, and 28th Infantry Division from Warsaw), two cavalry brigades (Nowogródzka Cavalry Brigade from Baranowicze, Podlaska Cavalry Brigade from Białystok) and the 4th Air Corps from Toruń.
- In the centre was Armia Polesie (also called Independent Operational Group Polesie), which was possibly composed of three infantry divisions (8th Infantry Division from Modlin, 27th Infantry Division from Kowel, 30th Infantry Division from Kobryń), one cavalry brigade (Mazowiecka Cavalry Brigade from Warsaw), Riverine Flotilla of the Polish Navy and the 3rd Air Corps from Poznań.
- Further south was Armia Wołyń, with three infantry divisions (2nd Legions Infantry Division from Kielce, 3rd Legions Infantry Division from Zamość, 13th Infantry Division from Równe), one cavalry brigade (Wołyńska Cavalry Brigade from Równe) and the 2nd Air Corps from Kraków.
- In the extreme south was Armia Podole, with five infantry divisions (5th Infantry Division from Lwów, 11th Infantry Division from Stanisławów, 12th Infantry Division from Tarnopol, 22nd Infantry Division from Przemyśl, 24th Infantry Division from Jarosław), two cavalry brigades (Podolska Cavalry Brigade from Stanisławów, Kresowa Cavalry Brigade from Brody) and the 6th Air Corps from Lwów.

Apart from those units were all of the armies' Border Area Defence Corps units and garrisons of the main cities.

=== Reserve forces ===
- Behind Armia Wilno and Armia Baranowicze was Armia Lida, with three infantry divisions.
- Behind Armia Podole and Armia Wołyń was Armia Lwów, with two infantry divisions and a cavalry brigade (5th Krakowska BK from Kraków).
- Far behind the frontlines, around the city of Brzesc, was the main reserve, with probably six IDs, two cavalry brigades (7th Wielkopolska BK from Poznań, 8th Pomorska BK from Bydgoszcz), an armoured brigade and the 1st Warsaw Air Corps.

== Red Army along Polish border ==
In the mid-1930s, the Soviet government started an immense armament program, which resulted in a rapid increase in the number of units. The number of tanks and airplanes along the Polish border grew significantly, and the Soviets enjoyed superiority in all ways. Polish planners anticipated that the Soviets had three times as many soldiers as their Polish Army. The Soviets' superiority in tanks and airplanes was not estimated, but the disproportion was immense. In August 1939, along the Polish border were likely as many as 173 Red Army infantry divisions (see Soviet order of battle for invasion of Poland in 1939).

== Invasion of Poland ==
On September 1, 1939, Germany attacked Poland. Consequently, Plan East became void. On September 17, with a free hand because of the Molotov–Ribbentrop Pact, the Soviets broke their non-aggression pact by invading Poland. The Red Army met little resistance, as the Polish Army was concentrated in the west in fighting the Germans. Thus, the Soviets quickly managed to occupy Polish Kresy.

== See also ==
- Prometheism
- Sarny Fortified Area
