= Battle of Wizna =

Battle between Wehrmacht and Polish Army forces during the 1939 Invasion of Poland

Coordinates: 53°12′45″N 22°29′23″E

- Part of the Invasion of Poland
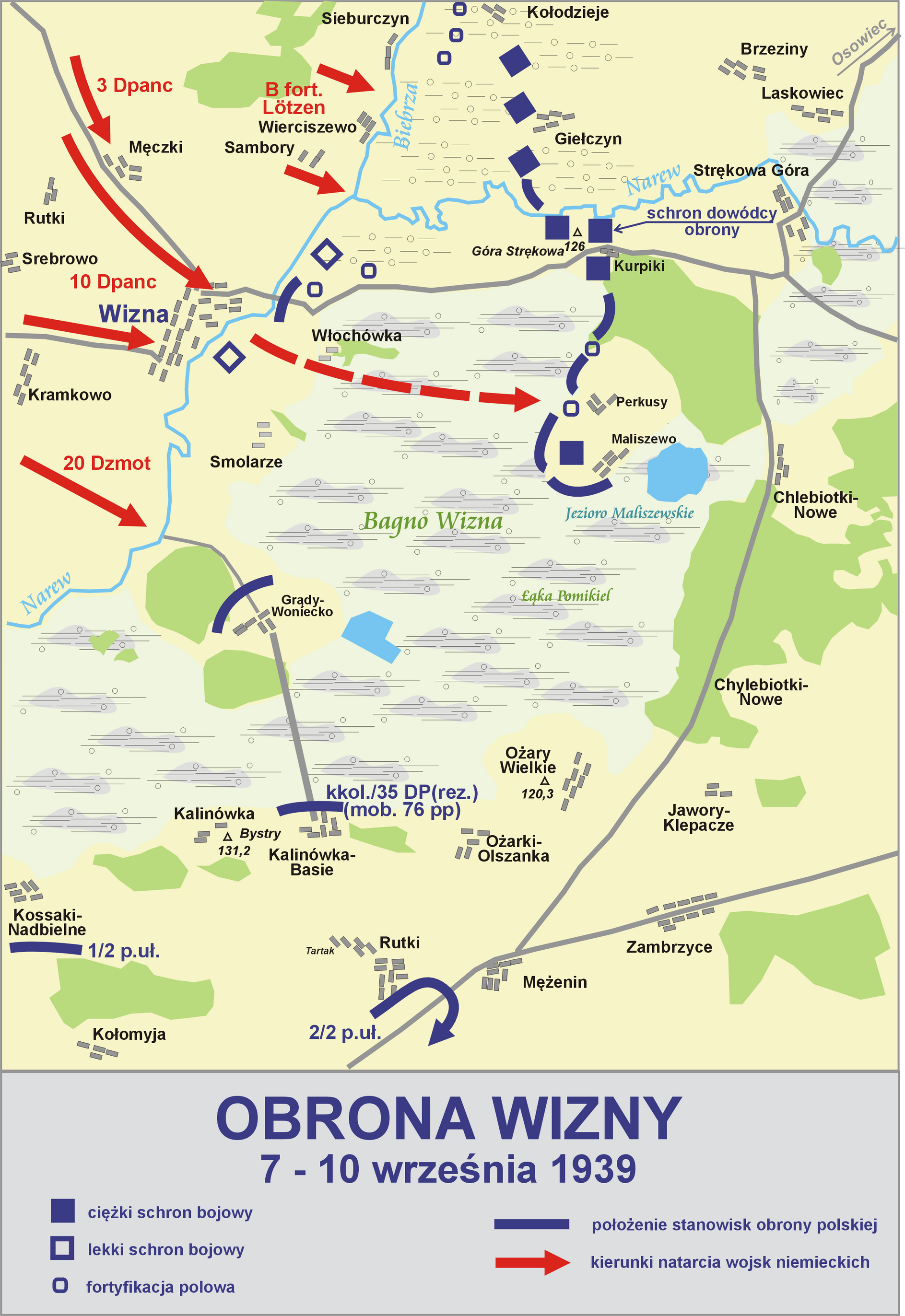
- Tactical map of the battle
Date	September 7–10, 1939
Location	Wizna, Warsaw Voivodeship, Poland
Result	German victory

Belligerents
Germany	Poland

Commanders and leaders
Heinz Guderian; Ferdinand Schaal	Władysław Raginis ‡‡ Stanisław Brykalski †

Strength
41,000 infantry 350 tanks 657 artillery pieces	900 infantry 6 76 mm guns 42 MGs; 2 anti-tank rifles

Casualties and losses
Several dozen dead 10 tanks and several other AFVs	~660 casualties 40 captured

The Battle of Wizna (Polish: Obrona Wizny) was fought between September 7 and September 10, 1939, between the forces of Poland and Germany during the initial stages of the invasion of Poland, which marked the beginning of the Second World War in Europe. According to Polish historian Leszek Moczulski, between 350 and 720 Poles defended a fortified line for three days against more than 40,000 Germans. Although defeat was inevitable, the Polish defence stalled the attacking forces for three days and postponed the encirclement of Independent Operational Group Narew fighting nearby. Eventually the tanks broke through the Polish line and German engineers eliminated all the shelters one by one. The last shelter surrendered around midday on September 10.

Because the battle consisted of a small force holding a piece of fortified territory against a vastly larger invasion for three days at great cost before being annihilated, Wizna is sometimes referred to as the "Polish Thermopylae". One of the symbols of the battle is Captain Władysław Raginis, the commanding officer of the Polish force, who swore to hold his position as long as he was alive. When the last two shelters under his command ran out of ammunition, he ordered his men to surrender their arms and committed suicide by detonating a grenade against his neck.

== History ==
=== Background ===
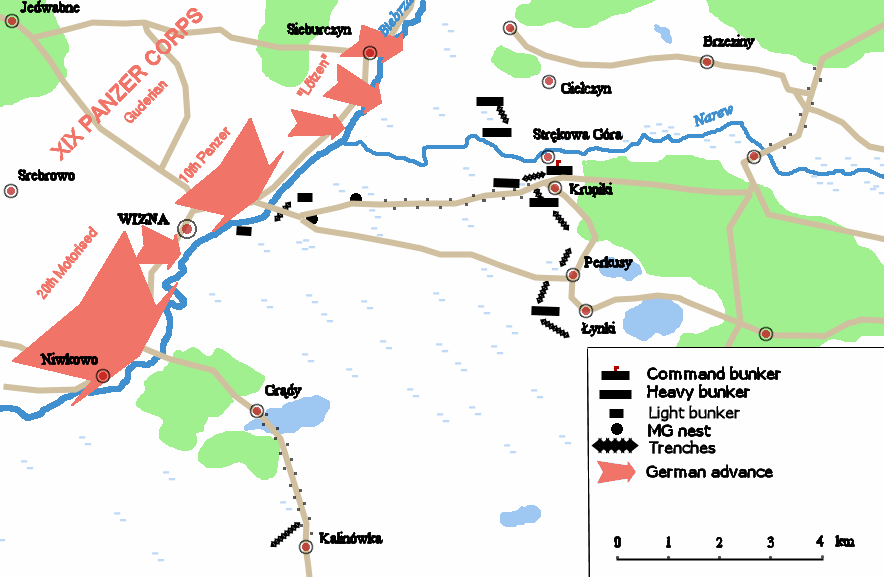
Positions prior to the battle.

Before the war, the area of the village of Wizna was prepared as a fortified line of defence. It was to shield the Polish positions further to the south and guard the crossing of the Narew and Biebrza rivers. The 9 kilometres (5.6 mi) long line of Polish defences stretched between the villages of Kołodzieje and Grądy-Woniecko, with Wizna in the centre. The line ran some 35 kilometres (22 mi) from the border with East Prussia, along an elevated banks of Narew and Biebrza rivers. Units defending the line were subordinate to the Polish Independent Operational Group Narew shielding Łomża and providing defence of the northern approach to Warsaw. The Wizna fortified area was one of the most important nodes in Northern Poland, providing cover of both the river crossings, and the roads Łomża–Białystok and roads towards Brześć Litewski on the rear of Polish forces.

Construction started in June 1939, only two months before the outbreak of World War II. The spot was chosen carefully; most of the concrete bunkers were built on hills overlooking a swampy Narew River valley. They could be reached either through direct assault through the swamps or by attack along the causeway leading from the bridge in Wizna. Before September 1, 1939, only 16 bunkers were built out of 60 planned. Six bunkers were made of heavy concrete with reinforced steel cupolas weighing 8 tons each, armed with machine guns and anti-tank artillery. Two were light concrete bunkers, armed with machine guns only. The remaining eight were ad hoc machine gun pillboxes, protected mostly by sandbags and earthworks. Four additional heavy bunkers were under construction when World War II started. In addition, the area was reinforced with trenches, anti-tank and anti-personnel obstacles, barbed wire lines and land mines. There were also plans to break the dams on the Biebrza and Narew rivers to flood the area, but the summer of 1939 was one of the driest seasons in Polish history and the water level was too low.

Although not all bunkers were ready by the beginning of the war, the Polish lines of defence were well-prepared. The walls of an average bunker, 1.5 metres thick and reinforced with 20-centimetre-thick steel plates, could withstand a direct hit from even the heaviest guns available to the Wehrmacht at the time. The bunkers were situated on hills which gave good visibility of all the advancing forces.

=== Opposing forces ===
The Polish defensive line was initially manned by a single battalion from the 71st Infantry Regiment, commanded by Major Jakub Fober. However, shortly before the outbreak of World War II it was reinforced with a machine gun company from Osowiec Fortress under Captain Władysław Raginis, as well as numerous smaller detachments from a variety of units. On September 2, 1939, the III/71 battalion departed for Osowiec, and Fober passed command over Wizna to Raginis and his men. Altogether, the Polish defensive position was manned by 720 men: 20 officers and 700 NCOs and privates. However, some sources claim that the Polish unit was even weaker, no more than 360 men strong.

Although the Polish units were almost entirely composed of conscripts mobilised in August 1939 rather than professional soldiers, their morale was very high. After the war, Guderian had trouble explaining why his corps was stopped by such a small force. In his memoirs he attributes the delay to his officers "having trouble building bridges across the rivers". During the Nuremberg Trials he remarked that Wizna was "well-defended by a local officer school".

Polish Army
Narew IOG
Młot-Fijałkowski
Odcinek Obrony "Wizna"
Raginis
8th company of 135th Infantry Regiment
Schmidt
3rd heavy MG company of Osowiec fortress batt.
Raginis
Battery of positional artillery
Brykalski
136th company of engineers
Platoon of engineers and platoon of field artillery of 71st Infantry Regiment
Platoon of mounted reconnaissance of 135th Infantry Regiment
720 men, 12 bunkers, 6 pieces of artillery (76mm), 24 Heavy machine guns, 18 machine guns and two Kb ppanc wz.35 anti-tank rifles

Wehrmacht
3rd Army
Küchler
XIX Army Corps
Guderian
3rd Panzer Division
von Geyr
20th Motorised Division
Wiktorin

10th Panzer Division
Schaal
"Lötzen" Infantry Brigade
Offenbacher
42,000 men, 350 tanks, 108 howitzers, 58 pieces of artillery, 195 anti-tank guns, 108 mortars, 188 grenade launchers, 288 heavy machine guns and 689 machine guns

=== Before the battle ===
On September 1, 1939, the Polish Defensive War and World War II started. The German 3rd Army was to advance from East Prussia towards Warsaw, directly through the positions of Polish Narew Corps. On September 2 Captain Władysław Raginis was named the commander of the Wizna area. As his command post he chose the "GG-126" bunker near the village of Góra Strękowa. The bunker was located on a hill in the exact centre of the Polish lines. His forces numbered approximately 700 soldiers and NCOs and 20 officers armed with 6 pieces of artillery (75mm), 24 HMGs, 18 machine guns and two Kb ppanc wz.35 anti-tank rifles, with just 20 bullets.

After initial clashes at the border, the Podlaska Cavalry Brigade operating in the area, during the night of 3/4 September was ordered to withdraw and on September 5 it left the area and marched toward Mały Płock to cross the river Narew. On September 3 Polish positions were spotted from the air and strafed with machine gun fire from enemy fighters.

On September 7, 1939, the reconnaissance units of the 10th Panzer Division of General Nikolaus von Falkenhorst captured the village of Wizna. Polish mounted reconnaissance squads abandoned the village after a short fight and retreated to the southern bank of Narew. When German tanks tried to cross the bridge, it was blown up by Polish engineers. After dark, patrols of German infantry crossed the river and advanced towards Giełczyn, but were repelled with heavy casualties.

On September 8, General Heinz Guderian, commander of the XIX Panzer Corps, was ordered to advance through Wizna towards Brześć. By the early morning of September 9, his units reached the Wizna area and were joined with 10th Panzer Division and "Lötzen" Infantry Brigade already present in the area. His forces numbered some 1,200 officers and 41,000 soldiers and NCOs, equipped with over 350 tanks, 108 howitzers, 58 pieces of artillery, 195 anti-tank guns, 108 mortars, 188 grenade launchers, 288 heavy machine guns, and 689 machine guns. Altogether, his forces were some 60 times stronger than the Polish defenders.

=== Defence of Wizna ===
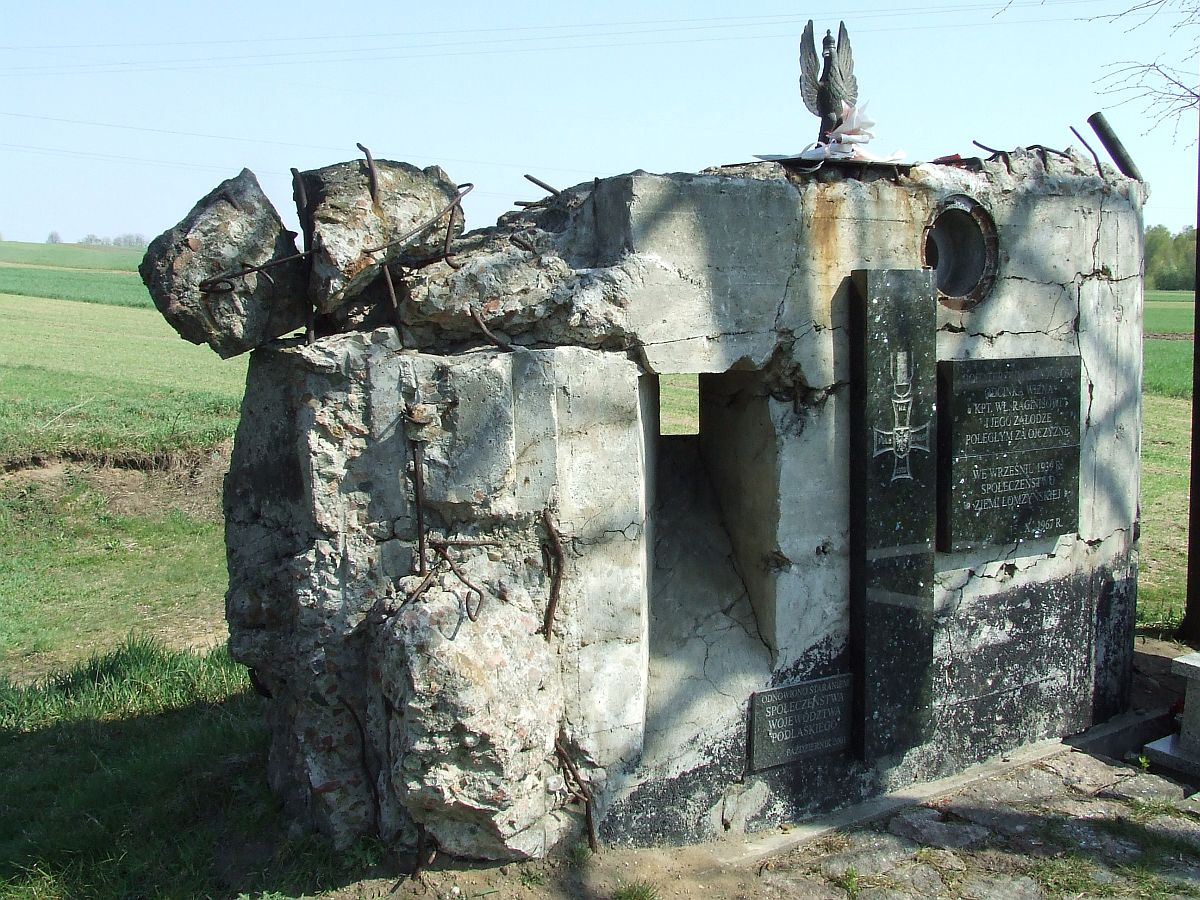
Ruins of one of the bunkers, now a memorial site.

In the early morning, German planes dropped leaflets that urged the Poles to surrender and claimed that most of Poland was already in German hands, and that further resistance was futile. In order to strengthen the morale of his troops, Władysław Raginis and Lieutenant Brykalski swore that they would not leave their post alive and that resistance would continue. Soon after that a German artillery barrage and aerial bombardment started. The Polish artillery was much weaker and was soon forced to retreat towards Białystok. After preparation, the Germans attacked the northern flank of the Polish forces. Two platoons defending several bunkers located to the north of Narew were attacked from three sides by German tanks and infantry. Initially the losses among German infantry were high, but after heavy artillery fire, the commander of the Giełczyn area, First Lieutenant Kiewlicz, was ordered to burn the wooden bridge over Narew and withdraw to Białystok. The remnants of his forces broke through the German encirclement and reached Białystok, where they joined the forces of General Franciszek Kleeberg.

At the same time, an assault on the southern part of Polish fortifications became a stalemate. The Polish bunkers lacked adequate anti-tank armament, but were able to rake the German infantry with machine gun fire. However, at 6 o'clock in the evening, the Polish infantry was forced to abandon the trenches and field fortifications and retreat into the bunkers. The German tanks could finally cross the Polish lines and advance towards Tykocin and Zambrów. However, the German infantry was still under heavy fire and was pinned down in the swampy fields in front of the Polish bunkers.

Although Raginis was subordinate to Lieutenant Colonel Tadeusz Tabaczyński, commander of the Osowiec fortified area located some 30 kilometres to the north, he could not expect any reinforcements. On September 8, the Marshal of Poland, Edward Rydz-Śmigły, ordered the 135th Infantry Regiment, which constituted the reserves of both Osowiec and Wizna, to be withdrawn to Warsaw. When the order was withdrawn and the unit returned to Osowiec, it was already too late to help the isolated Poles at Wizna.

Heavy fighting for each of the now isolated bunkers continued. Several assaults were repelled during the night and in the early morning of September 10. At approximately 11 o'clock, German engineers, with the help of tanks and artillery, finally managed to destroy all but two of the Polish bunkers. Both of them were located in the centre of Strękowa Góra and continued fighting despite having much of the crew wounded or incapacitated and most of their machine guns destroyed. After the war, the Poles insisted that Guderian, in an attempt to end the Polish resistance, threatened the Polish commander that he would shoot the POWs if the remaining forces did not surrender. The resistance, however, continued for another hour, when a German envoy arrived carrying a flag of truce and proposed a cease fire. It lasted until approximately 1:30 p.m. Raginis, realising that all of his men were wounded and his ammunition was almost depleted, ordered his men to surrender their arms to the Germans. He himself – seriously injured at the time – refused to surrender and committed suicide by detonating a grenade against his neck.

=== Aftermath ===
After the Polish resistance ended, the XIX Panzer Corps advanced towards Wysokie Mazowieckie and Zambrów, where it fought the Battle of Zambrów against the Polish 18th Infantry Division, finally encircling and destroying the Polish division during the Battle of Andrzejewo. Later it advanced further southwards and took part in the Battle of Brześć.

Although all the bunkers were destroyed and the Polish resistance was finally broken, the fortified area of Wizna managed to halt the German advance for three days. The heroic struggle against overwhelming odds is one of the symbols of the Polish Defensive War of 1939 and is a part of Polish popular culture.

== Casualties ==
Exact Polish losses are unknown, mostly because very little is known of the soldiers that were taken as prisoners of war by the Germans. Out of 720 Polish soldiers, only approximately 70 survived. Some successfully withdrew and reached the Polish lines, others were taken prisoner. Some of the prisoners were subsequently killed by the Germans, others were beaten and abused but survived and were eventually taken to POW camps.

German losses are not known either. An official release by the Wehrmacht mentioned "several dozen dead".

The Wehrmacht lost at least 10 tanks and several other AFVs in the struggle.

The history of the 10th Tank Division for September 8 mentions 9 killed and 26 wounded in action for the ALA. The I./IR 86, which was the main unit of the capture of the bunkers reported on September 9 at 17:00 the loss of 40 men. There are some losses of the Tank Regiment 8 reported as well. The following fighting at Wysokie-Mazowieckie and Andrzejewo make it difficult to differentiate the losses.

== In popular culture ==
The Battle of Wizna is the theme of the song "40:1", on the album The Art of War by the Swedish metal band Sabaton.

== See also ==
- Battle of Zadwórze
- Battle of Westerplatte
