= Łagiewniki-Borek Fałęcki =

- Dzielnica of Kraków
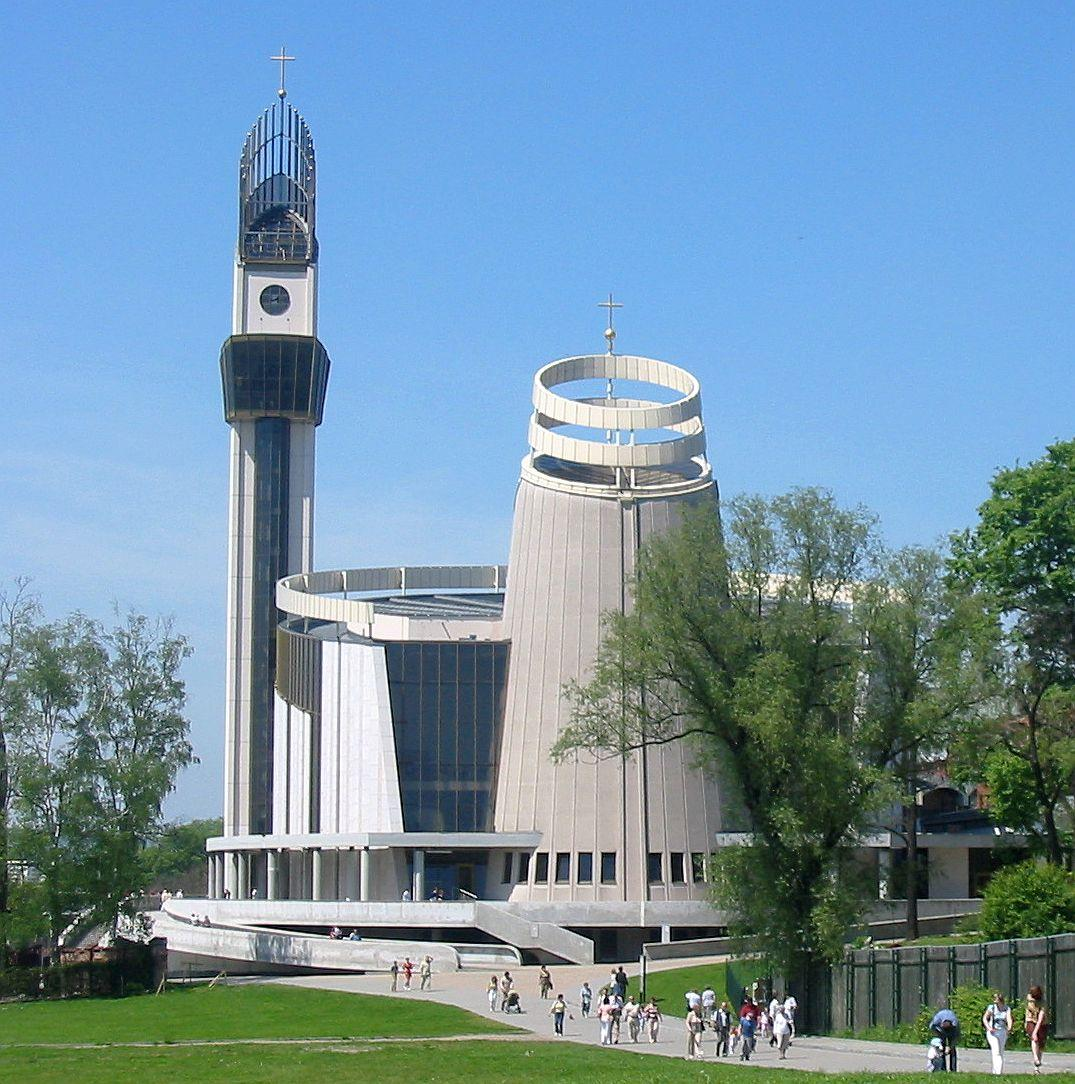
- Divine Mercy Sanctuary, Kraków

- Location of Łagiewniki-Borek Fałęcki within Kraków
- Coordinates: 50°0′59.3″N 19°55′15.9″E
- Country: Poland
- Voivodeship: Lesser Poland
- County/City: Kraków

Government
  - President: Jan Pietras

Area
  - Total: 5.42 km^{2} (2.09 sq mi)

Population (2014)
  - Total: 14,859
  - Density: 2,740/km^{2} (7,100/sq mi)
- Time zone: UTC+1 (CET)
  - Summer (DST): UTC+2 (CEST)
- Area code: +48 12
- Website: http://www.dzielnica9.krakow.pl

Łagiewniki-Borek Fałęcki is one of 18 districts of Kraków, located in the southern part of the city. The name Łagiewniki-Borek Fałęcki comes from two villages that are now parts of the district.

According to the Central Statistical Office data, the district's area is 5.42 square kilometres (2.09 square miles) and 14 859 people inhabit Łagiewniki-Borek Fałęcki.

== Subdivisions of Łagiewniki-Borek Fałęcki ==
Łagiewniki-Borek Fałęcki is divided into smaller subdivisions (osiedles). Here's a list of them.

- Borek Fałęcki
- Łagiewniki
- Osiedle Cegielniana
- Osiedle Zaułek Jugowicki
