= 8th Kentucky Cavalry Regiment =

- Active: August 13, 1862 - September 23, 1863
- Country: United States
- Allegiance: Union
- Branch: Cavalry

The 8th Kentucky Cavalry Regiment was a cavalry regiment that served in the Union Army during the American Civil War.

== Service ==
The 8th Kentucky Cavalry Regiment was organized at Russellville, Kentucky and mustered in for one year on August 13, 1862. It mustered in under the command of Colonel James Murrell Shackelford.

The regiment was attached to District of Louisville, Kentucky, Department of the Ohio, to November 1862. It was unattached at Bowling Green, District of Western Kentucky, Department of the Ohio, to June 1863; attached to the 1st Brigade, 2nd Division, XXIII Corps, Army of the Ohio, to August 1863; unassigned, at Bowling Green, Kentucky; and attached to the 1st Division, XXIII Corps, to September 1863.

The 8th Kentucky Cavalry mustered out of service on September 23, 1863.

== Detailed service ==
Duty at Russellville, Bowling Green and Hopkinsville, Kentucky, District of West Kentucky, and at Clarksville, Tennessee, operating against guerrillas, until September 1863. Actions at Morganfield, Kentucky, August 3, 1862. Madisonville August 25. Morganfield September 1. Geiger's Lake September 3. Near Madisonville September 4. Ashbysburg September 25. Henderson County November 1. Greenville Road November 5. Garrettsburg November 6. Rural Hill, Tennessee, November 18. Near Nashville, Tennessee, January 28, 1863. Expedition from Bowling Green, Kentucky, to Tennessee State Line May 2–6. Operations against Morgan July 2–26. Buffington's Island, Ohio, July 19.

== Casualties ==
The regiment lost a total of 117 men during service; 1 officer and 8 enlisted men killed or mortally wounded, 4 officers and 104 enlisted men died of disease.

== Commanders ==
- Colonel James Murrell Shackelford
- Colonel Benjamin Helm Bristow

== See also ==
- List of Kentucky Union Civil War units
- Kentucky in the Civil War
