= Romanian Bridgehead =

Former area in southeastern Poland

Poland (1922–1938). Romania (dark brown) is to the southeast of Poland.

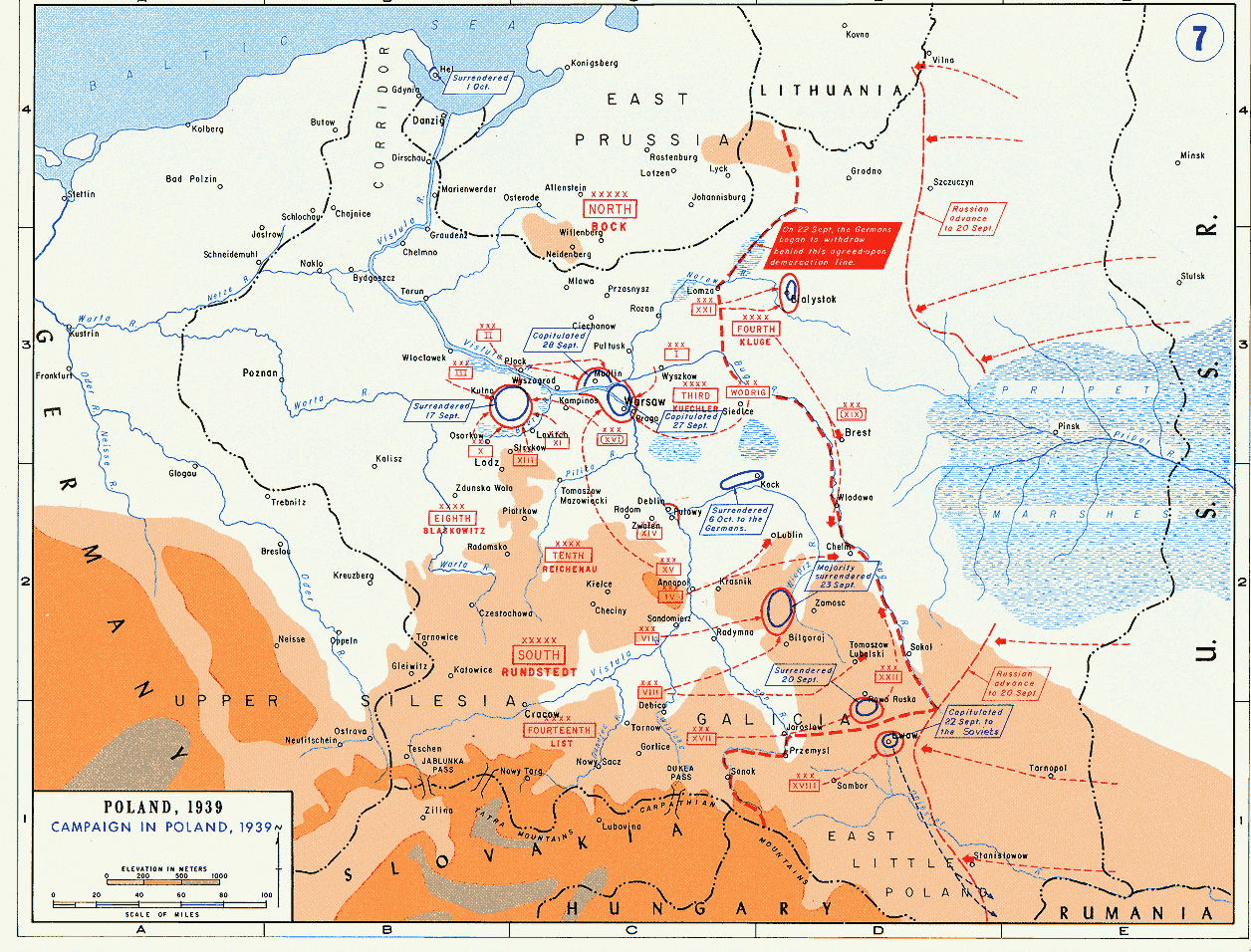
Polish and German forces after 14 September 1939 and troop movements after this date.

The Romanian Bridgehead (Polish: Przedmoście rumuńskie; Romanian: Capul de pod român) was an area in southeastern Second Polish Republic that is now located in Ukraine. During the invasion of Poland in 1939 at the start of the Second World War, the Polish commander-in-chief, Marshal of Poland Edward Rydz-Śmigły, ordered all Polish troops fighting east of the Vistula (approximately 20 divisions still retaining the ability to co-operate) to withdraw towards Lwów and then to the hills along the borders with the Kingdom of Romania and the Soviet Union on 14 September. After the Soviets attacked on 17 September, Rydz-Śmigły ordered all units to withdraw to Romania and the Kingdom of Hungary, but communications had become disrupted although smaller units crossed outside the major battles.

The plan was a default plan in case it was impossible to defend the Polish borders, and it assumed that the Polish forces would be able to retreat to the area, organise a successful defence until the winter and hold out until the promised French offensive on the Western Front had started. Rydz-Śmigły predicted that the hills, valleys, swamps and the rivers Stryj and Dniester would provide natural lines of defence against the Nazi German advance. The area was also home to many ammunition dumps that were prepared for the third wave of Polish troops, and it was linked by transport to the Romanian port of Constanța, which could be used to resupply the Polish troops.

The plan is one of the reasons that the Polish–Romanian alliance was not activated by Poland. Poland and Romania had been allied since 1921, and the defensive pact was still valid by 1939. However, the Polish government decided that it would be much more helpful to have a safe haven in Romania and the safe port of Constanța that could accept as many Allied merchant ships as would be required to keep Poland fighting. Most of the Polish Navy and merchant marine had been evacuated prior to 1 September (see Peking Plan) and would operate from French and British ports and deliver the supplies through Romania.

In adherence with the secret protocol of the Molotov–Ribbentrop Pact, which provided for the partition of Poland between Nazi Germany and the Soviet Union, the Soviets invaded Poland from the east during the early hours of 17 September and violated their non-aggression pact with Poland. However, the French, despite their promises, had not begun any significant offensive against Germany, which made it impossible for the Polish Army to hold out, at least in eastern parts of the country. During the late hours of that day, the Polish government and members of the military high command crossed the Polish–Romanian border with the intention of relocating to France, where the Polish Armed Forces in the West were to be formed.

Polish units were ordered to evacuate Poland and to reorganise in France. Polish units launched new counteroffensives in attempt to clear a path towards the Romanian Bridgehead, such as Kraków Army in the Battle of Tomaszów Lubelski. Some of Kazimierz Sosnkowski's units managed to evade German capture and continued the fight in Lwów, but others were stopped and captured by Soviet armored units. It was the intervention by the Red Army, which created a two-front war, that sealed the fate of the Romanian Bridgehead. Fragmented Polish units attempted to push southward and clear paths with limited success and started diversionary skirmishes, which slowed the Germans. The Polish defeat at the Battle of Lwów by the Germans and the Soviets disintegrated the efforts to clear a path to the Romanian Bridgehead. Nonetheless, many small groups of Polish soldiers crossed the border at night.

As many as 120,000 Polish troops withdrew through the Romanian Bridgehead area to neutral Romania and Hungary. Most of those troops joined the newly-formed Polish Armed Forces in the West in France and the United Kingdom during 1939 and 1940. Until Germany attacked the Soviet Union during Operation Barbarossa and the United States joined the war, the Polish Army was one of the largest forces of the Allies.

The Romanian government also received the treasury of the National Bank of Poland in 1939. Part of it, consisting of 1,261 crates containing 82,403 kg of gold, was loaded aboard a commercial ship in the port of Constanța and transported to Western Europe. The transport was escorted by ships of the Romanian Navy to prevent its interception by Soviet submarines in the Black Sea. The second part of the treasury was deposited in the National Bank of Romania and was returned to Poland on 17 September 1947.

== Gallery ==
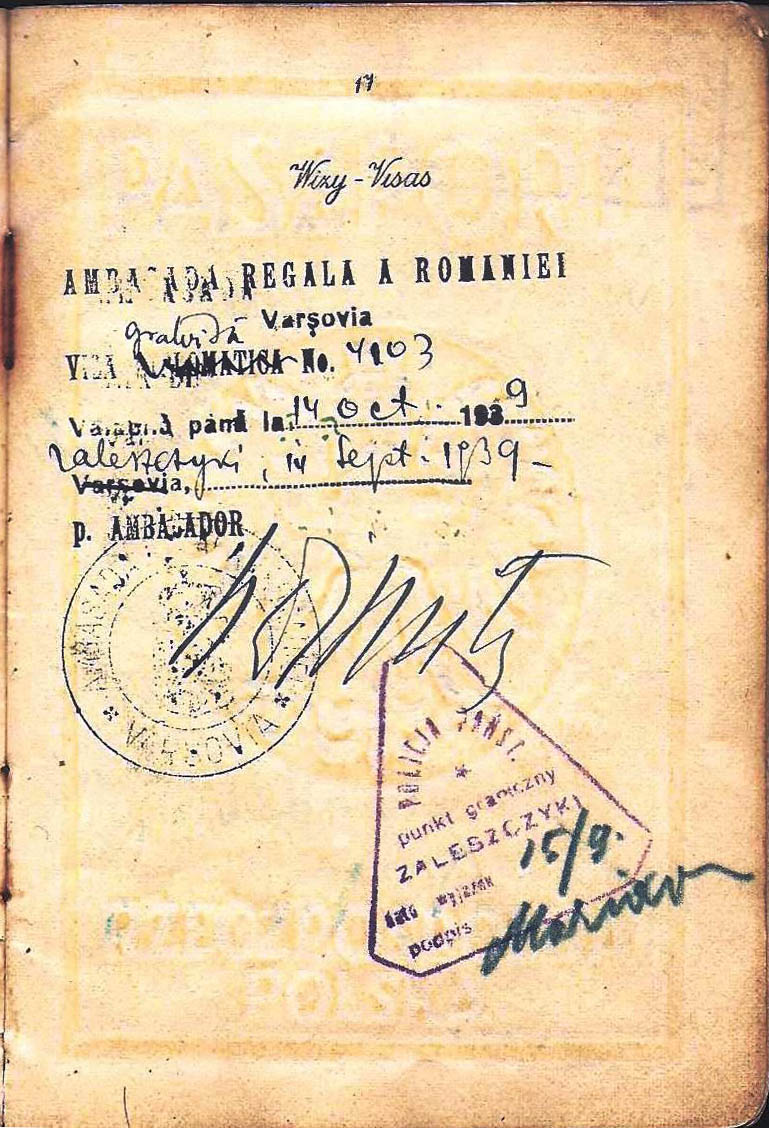
A passport showing a crossing of the border at Zaleszczyki into Romania on 15 September 1939, two days before the Soviet invasion from the east.

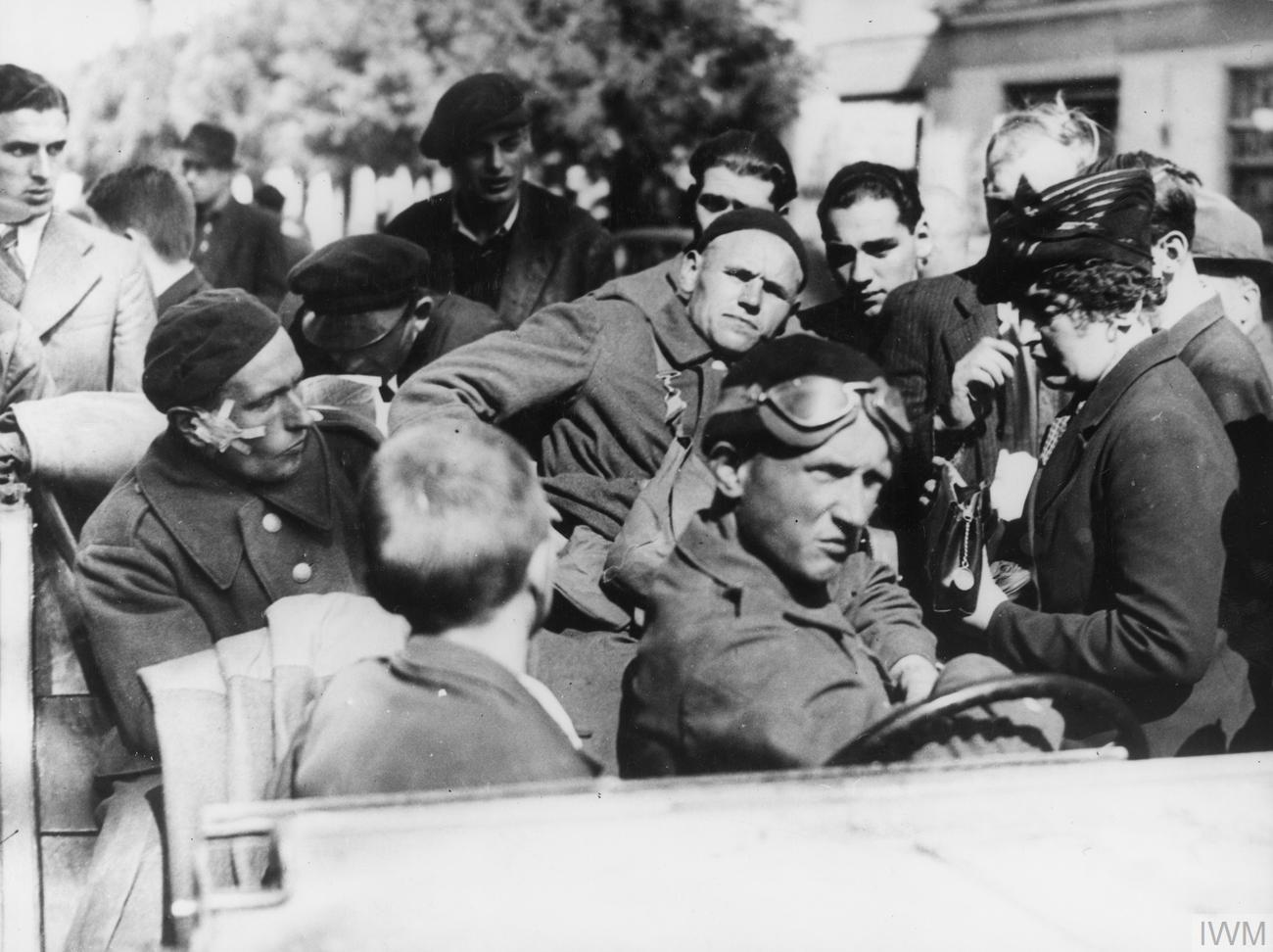
Polish troops, escapees from Nazi–Soviet occupied Poland, being welcomed by Romanian population while crossing the Romanian border.

== See also ==
- Romania during World War II
- Sarny Fortified Area
- Poland–Romania relations
