= Góra Strękowa =

- Village
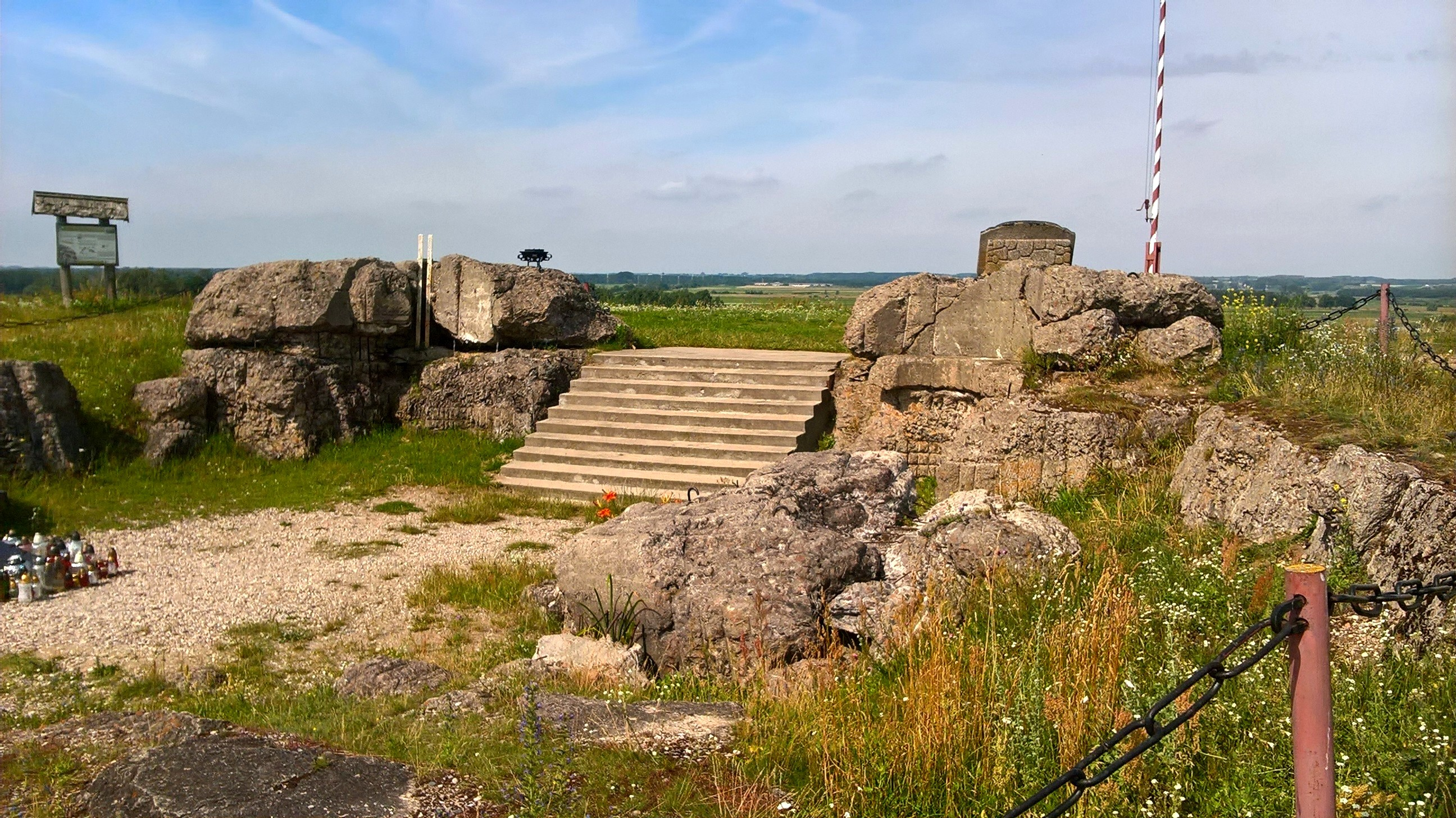
- Cpt. Raginis bunker ruins in Góra Strękowa

- Location within Poland
- Coordinates: 53°12′46″N 22°29′23″E
- Country: Poland
- Voivodeship: Podlaskie
- County: Białystok
- Gmina: Zawady

Population
  - Total: 60
- Time zone: UTC+1 (CET)
  - Summer (DST): UTC+2 (CEST)
- Postal code: 16-075
- Vehicle registration: BIA

Góra Strękowa [ˈɡura strɛnˈkɔva] is a village in the administrative district of Gmina Zawady, within Białystok County, Podlaskie Voivodeship, in north-eastern Poland.

== History ==
According to the 1921 census, the village had a population of 46, entirely Polish by nationality and Roman Catholic by confession.

During the German invasion of Poland in World War II it formed the centre of the Polish defensive positions during the Battle of Wizna.
