= Vishnyavyets, Minsk region =

Agrotown in Minsk Region, Belarus

Vishnyavyets Вішнявец (Belarusian) Вишневец (Russian)
- Agrotown
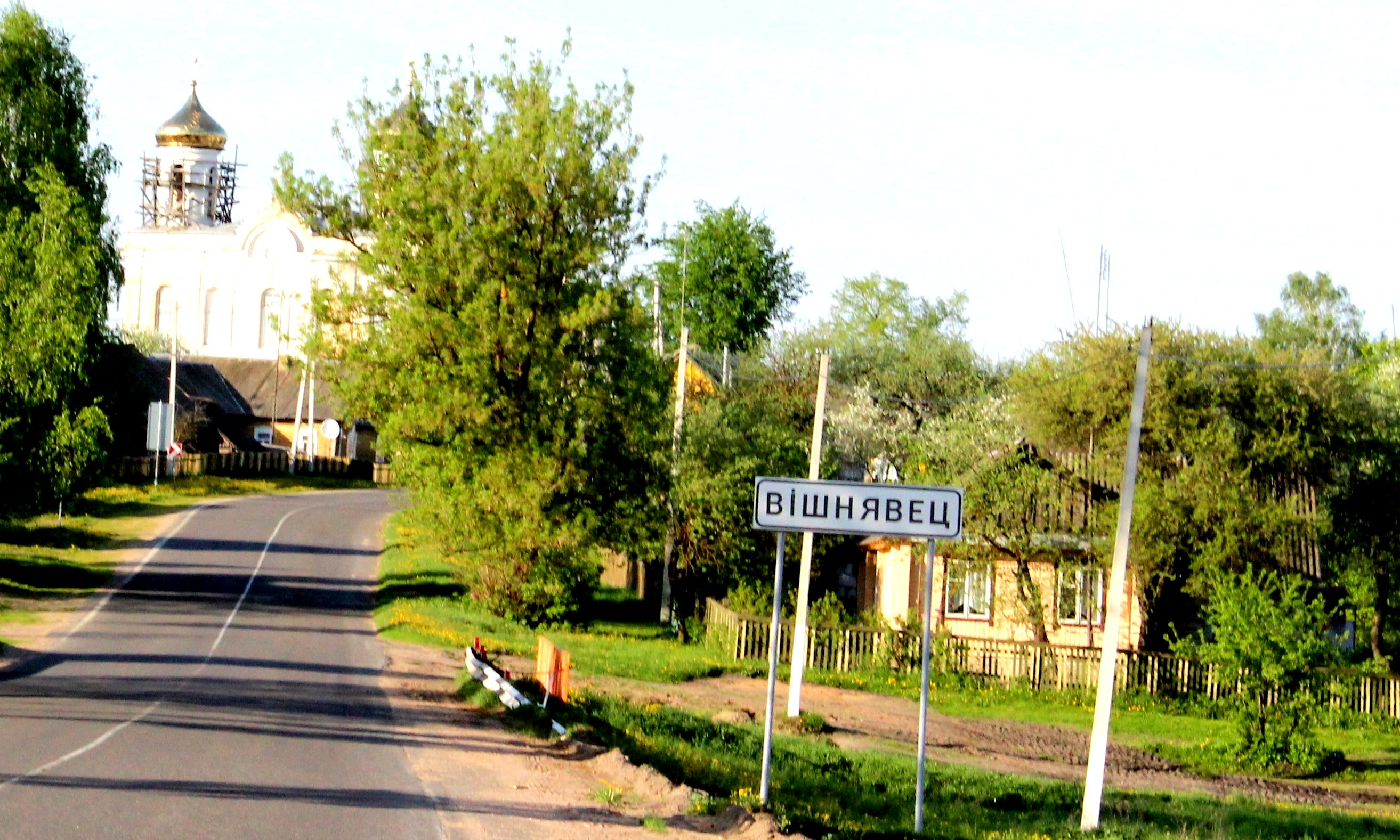

- Location within Belarus
- Coordinates: 53°20′55″N 26°41′15″E
- Country: Belarus
- Region: Minsk Region
- District: Stowbtsy District
- Time zone: UTC+3 (MSK)

Vishnyavyets (Belarusian: Вішнявец, romanized: Višniaviec; Russian: Вишневец, romanized: Vishnevets) is an agrotown in Stowbtsy District, Minsk Region, Belarus. It serves as the administrative center of Vishnyavyets selsoviet. It is located 18 kilometres (11 mi) from Stowbtsy and 96 kilometres (60 mi) from the capital Minsk. In 1996, it had a population of 681.
