= Mikalayewshchynski rural council =

Mikalayewshchynski rural council is a lower-level subdivision (selsoviet) of Stowbtsy district, Minsk region, Belarus.
