= Rubyazhevitski rural council =

Rubyazhevitski rural council is a lower-level subdivision (selsoviet) of Stowbtsy district, Minsk region, Belarus.
