= Friedrich-Werner Graf von der Schulenburg =

German diplomat (1875–1944)

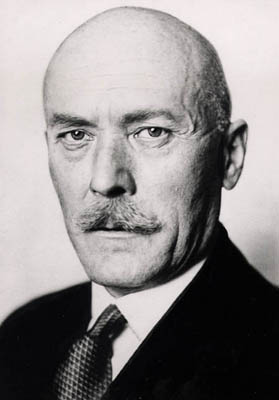

German ambassador to the Soviet Union
- In office 1934 – 22 June 1941
- Führer: Adolf Hitler
- Preceded by: Rudolf Nadolny
- Succeeded by: Relations severed Rudolf Appelt (East Germany, 1949); Wilhelm Haas (West Germany, 1956); Klaus Blech (Reunited Germany, 1990)

Personal details
- Born: 20 November 1875 Kemberg, Saxony-Anhalt, German Empire
- Died: 10 November 1944 (aged 68) Plötzensee Prison, Berlin, Nazi Germany
- Cause of death: Execution by hanging
- Party: Nazi Party (1934-1944)
- Spouse: Elisabeth von Sobbe (1908–1910)
- Children: Christa-Wernfriedis von der Schulenburg
- Occupation: Diplomat

Friedrich-Werner Erdmann Matthias Johann Bernhard Erich Graf von der Schulenburg (20 November 1875 – 10 November 1944) was a German diplomat who served as the last German ambassador to the Soviet Union before Operation Barbarossa, the German attack on the Soviet Union in 1941, during World War II. He began his diplomatic career before World War I, serving as consul and ambassador in several countries.

After a prolonged conflict with the Nazi regime, he turned against the main Nazi Party and joined the conspiracy against Adolf Hitler. After the failed 20 July plot in 1944 to assassinate Hitler, Schulenburg was accused of being a co-conspirator and five months later executed.

He was a Knight of Justice of the Order of St John, which was regarded with disfavour by the Nazis.

== Diplomatic career ==
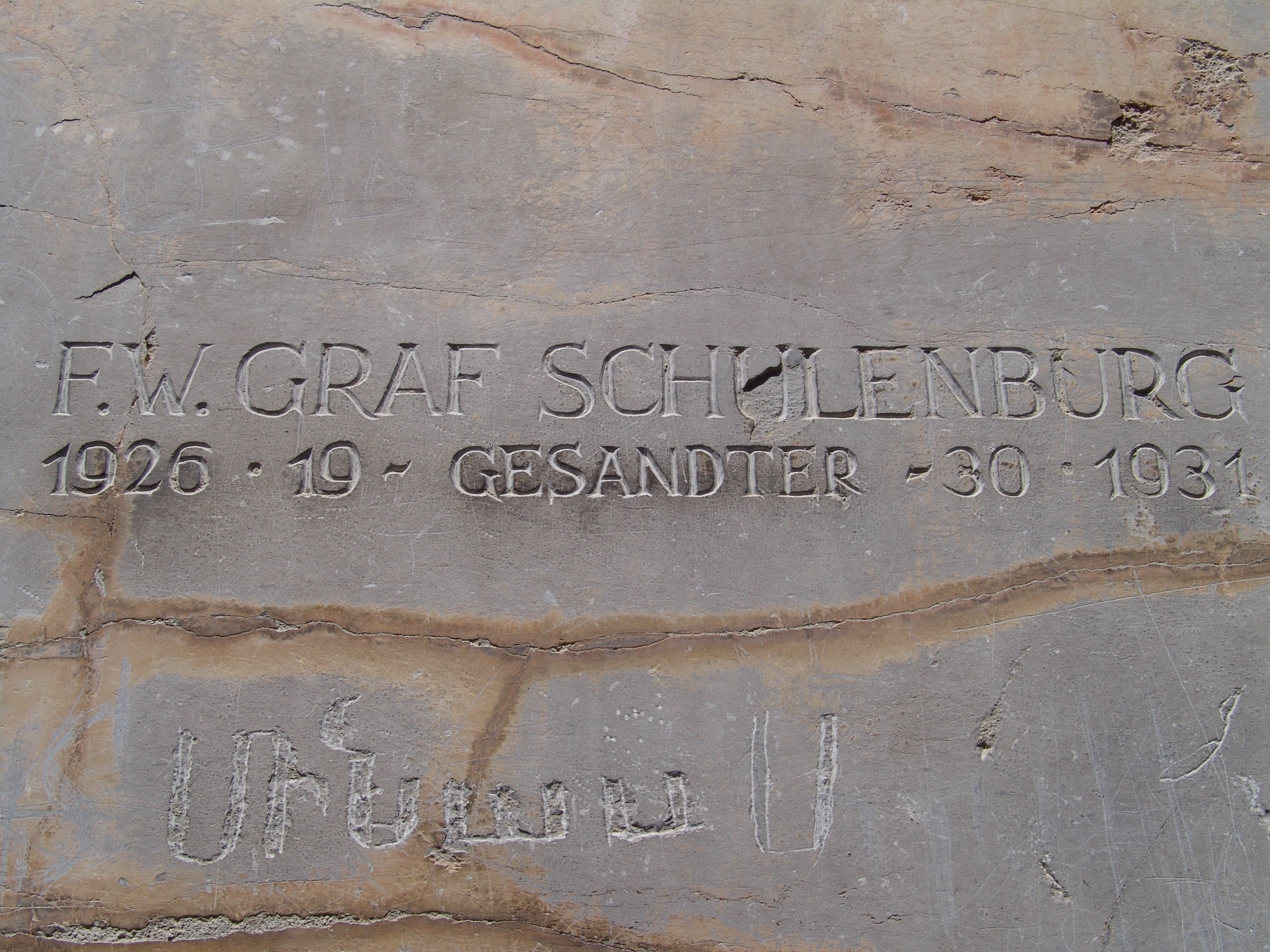
Inscription on the ancient statue at the entrance of Persepolis. Envoy F.W. Graf Schulenburg. 1926*1930*1931

Schulenburg was born in Kemberg, in the Prussian Province of Saxony, to Count Bernhard Friedrich Wilhelm von der Schulenburg, he was from the Brandenburgish House of Schulenburg, which was part of the Uradel (or old nobility). Friedrich-Werner was distantly related to the 17th-Century Saxon Generalfeldmarschall Count Johann Matthias von der Schulenburg and was a cousin to Friedrich Graf von der Schulenburg. After one year serving in the army, he studied law in Lausanne, Munich, and Berlin, and in 1901 joined the Foreign Office's consular service as a junior civil servant (Assessor). By 1903, he had been appointed as vice-consul at Germany's consulate general in Barcelona, and in the years that followed he found himself working at consulates in Lemberg, Prague, Warsaw, and Tbilisi. With the outbreak of the First World War in 1914, Schulenburg returned to the military, and after the First Battle of the Marne was promoted to captain in October 1914 and put in charge of an artillery battery. In 1915, he was posted as German liaison officer to the Ottoman Army on the Armenian Front. In October 1915, he arrived in Erzurum and succeed Max Scheubner-Richter as the German Vice Consul. In 1916, he took over the command of the Georgian Legion in the struggle against the Russian Empire until its collapse in 1917. During his time in the military, he received the Iron Cross and some high Ottoman honours. After the German Empire's collapse, he was captured by the British and interned on the Marmara Sea island of Prinkipo (now called Büyükada). He returned to Germany in 1919. Schulenburg was then reinstated in the Foreign Office Service and became German consul in Beirut.

Schulenburg served as the German ambassador to Iran from 1922 until 1931, when his visit to the ancient monuments at Persepolis resulted in his name being engraved at the Gate of All Nations. He joined the Nazi Party in 1934. From 1931 to 1934, he served as the German ambassador to Romania before he was posted to Moscow as the last German envoy to the Soviet Union before the invasion of that country by Germany in 1941.

== Noble estate ==
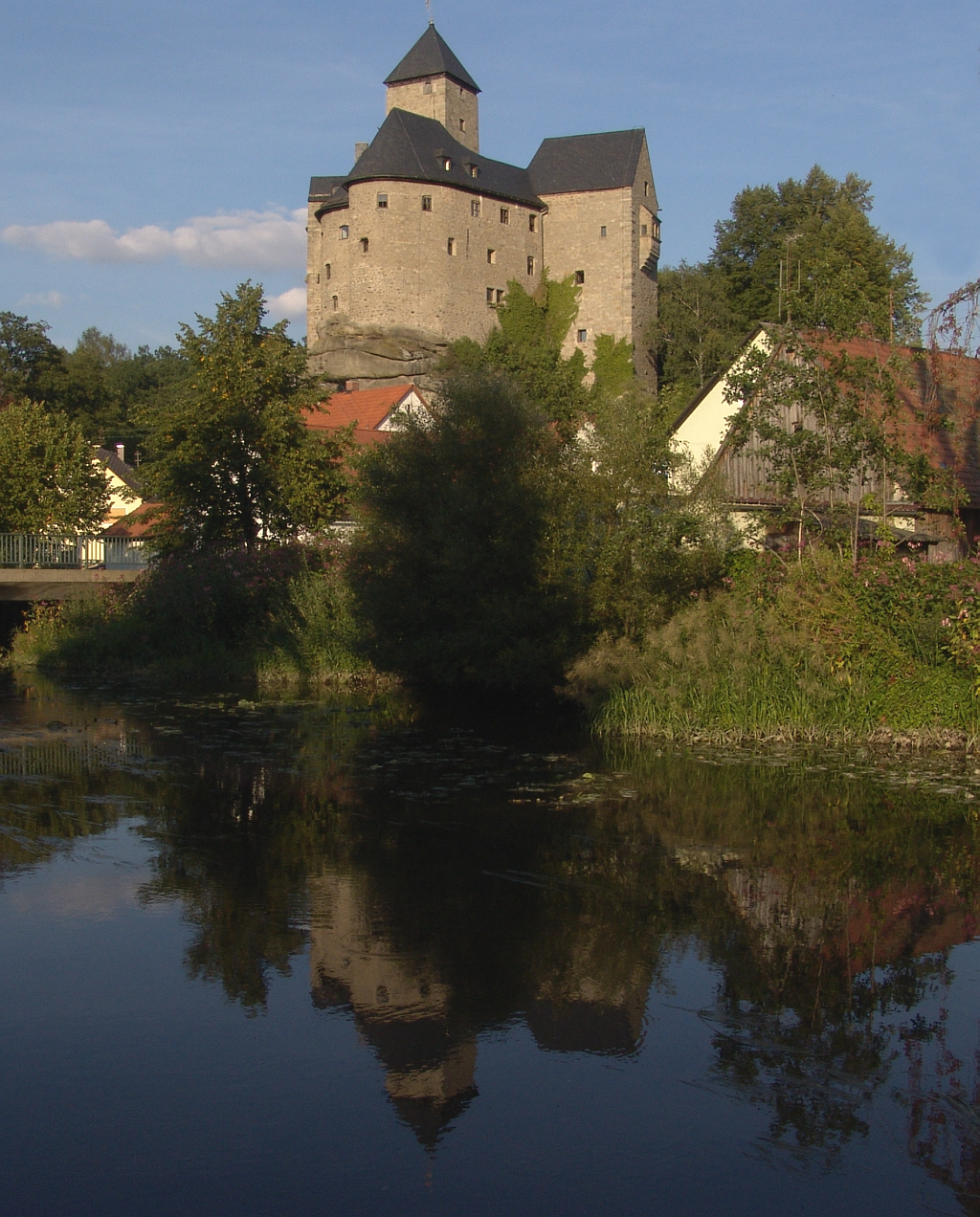
Burg Falkenberg today

In the 1930s, Schulenburg acquired the Burg Falkenberg, a castle in the Upper Palatinate. He had it converted and renovated to serve as a home for his retirement. This monumental work was undertaken between 1936 and 1939.

== Resistance activities ==
After the First World War, Schulenburg got his diplomatic career going again, becoming, among other things, an envoy to Tehran and Bucharest. In 1934, he was appointed German ambassador to the Soviet Union. Schulenburg favoured an agreement between Germany and the Soviet Union, and was instrumental in bringing about the German-Soviet Non-Aggression Pact of August 1939. After the Soviet invasion of Poland, despite the state of war between Germany and Poland, he used his position as the most senior ambassador in Moscow to allow Polish diplomats (including ambassador Wacław Grzybowski) to leave the Soviet Union, when the Soviets tried to arrest them.

Schulenburg was kept in the dark about Germany's planned invasion of the Soviet Union. He knew for certain that the invasion would take place only a few hours before it was launched, when Foreign Minister Joachim von Ribbentrop cabled him a message to read to Soviet Foreign Minister Vyacheslav Molotov justifying the invasion. He, however, got suspicions of what his government was planning to do in the spring of 1941. To the last, he tried to thwart any talk of invasion by such means as hinting at the Soviet Union's military strength and the unassailability of its industrial reserves. He is quoted as having said to Molotov on the morning of the attack: "For the last six years I've personally tried to do everything I could to encourage friendship between the Soviet Union and Germany. But you can't stand in the way of destiny." A few weeks before the invasion, Schulenburg tried to warn the Soviet Ambassador to Germany Vladimir Dekanozov of his suspicions, but Dekanozov dismissed the evidence of military preparations as false British propaganda.

After the German invasion began on 22 June 1941, Schulenburg was interned by the Soviets for a few weeks and was transferred to the Soviet-Turkish border for repatriation. Thereafter, Schulenburg was assigned as leader of the Russia Committee, a Foreign Office post with no political influence, to neutralize him.

He later joined the conspiracy to overthrow Hitler in the hope of reaching a quick peace agreement in the east. He was ready and willing to negotiate even with Joseph Stalin on behalf of the plotters. Had they been successful in overthrowing Hitler, Schulenburg would have been a high-ranking official in the Foreign Office; some sources had him listed as foreign minister. After the failure of the attempt on Hitler's life on 20 July 1944, Schulenburg was arrested and charged with high treason. On 23 October 1944, the Volksgerichtshof ("People's Court") sentenced him to death, and he was hanged on 10 November 1944 at Plötzensee Prison in Berlin.

== Marriage ==
He was married to Elisabeth von Sobbe (Burg bei Magdeburg, 1875–1955) from 1908 to 1910, and had a daughter:

- Christa-Wernfriedis Hanna Margarete Engelberta Gräfin von der Schulenburg (1908–1993), married to Max Wolfgang, Freiherr von Lindenfels (1908–1982)

== See also ==
- German resistance to Nazism
- Germany–Soviet Union relations, 1918–1941
- List of members of the 20 July plot

Diplomatic posts
Preceded by Rudolf Nadolny	German Ambassador to Soviet Union; 1934–1941	Succeeded by no replacement
