= Soviet invasion of Poland =

1939 World War II invasion

- Part of the invasion of Poland in World War II
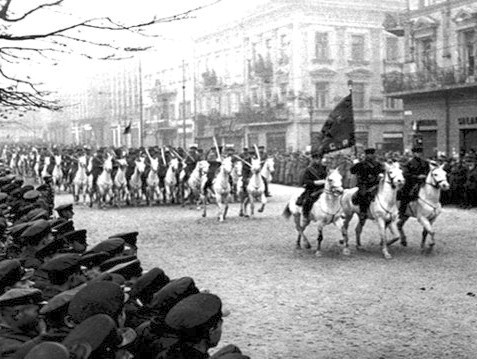
- Soviet parade in Lwów, September 1939, following the city's surrender
Date	17 September – 6 October 1939
Location	Poland
Result	Soviet victory
Territorial changes	Territory of Eastern Poland (Kresy) annexed by the Soviet Union

Belligerents
Poland	Soviet Union; Co-belligerent: (Nazi Germany) Germany

Commanders and leaders
(Second Polish Republic) Edward Rydz-Śmigły	(Soviet Union) Mikhail Kovalev (Soviet Union) Semyon Timoshenko

Strength
20,000 Border Protection Corps (Note: Increasing numbers of Border Protection Corps units, as well as Polish Army units stationed in the East during peacetime, were sent to the Polish-German border before or during the German invasion. The Border Protection Corps forces guarding the eastern border numbered approximately 20,000 men.); 450,000 Polish Army (Note: The retreat from the Germans disrupted and weakened Polish Army units, making estimates of their strength problematic. Sanford estimated that approximately 450,000 troops found themselves in the line of the Soviet advance and offered only sporadic resistance.)	600,000–800,000 troops 33+ divisions 11+ brigades 4,959 guns 4,736 tanks 3,300 aircraft

Casualties and losses
Total: ~343,000–477,000 3,000–7,000 killed or missing Up to 20,000 wounded (Note: The figures do not take into account the approximately 2,500 prisoners of war executed in immediate reprisals or by anti-Polish Organization of Ukrainian Nationalists.); 320,000–450,000 captured	Total: 3,858–13,000 1,475–3,000 killed or missing 2,383–10,000 wounded (Note: Soviet official losses – figures provided by Krivosheev – are currently estimated at 1,475 KIA or MIA presumed dead (Ukrainian Front – 972, Belorussian Front – 503), and 2,383 WIA (Ukrainian Front – 1,741, Belorussian Front – 642). The Soviets lost approximately 150 tanks in combat of which 43 as irrecoverable losses, while hundreds more suffered technical failures. Sanford indicates that Polish estimates of Soviet losses are 3,000 dead and 10,000 wounded. Russian historian Igor Bunich estimates Soviet losses at 5,327 KIA or MIA without a trace and WIA.)

The Soviet Union invaded Poland from the east, without a formal declaration of war, on 17 September 1939, 16 days after Nazi Germany invaded Poland from the west. Subsequent military operations lasted for the following 20 days and ended on 6 October 1939 with the two-way division and annexation of the entire territory of the Second Polish Republic by Nazi Germany and the Soviet Union. This division is sometimes called the Fourth Partition of Poland. The Soviet (as well as German) invasion of Poland was indirectly indicated in the "secret protocol" of the Molotov–Ribbentrop Pact signed on 23 August 1939, which divided Poland into "spheres of influence" of the two powers. German and Soviet cooperation in the invasion of Poland has been described as co-belligerence.

The Red Army, which vastly outnumbered the Polish defenders, achieved its targets, encountering only limited resistance. Some 320,000 Poles were made prisoners of war. The campaign of mass persecution in the newly acquired areas began immediately. In November 1939 the Soviet government annexed the entire Polish territory under its control. Some 13.5 million Polish citizens who fell under the military occupation were made Soviet subjects following show elections conducted by the NKVD secret police in an atmosphere of terror, the results of which were used to legitimise the use of force. A Soviet campaign of political murders and other forms of repression, targeting Polish figures of authority such as military officers, police, and priests, began with a wave of arrests and summary executions. The Soviet NKVD sent hundreds of thousands of people from eastern Poland to Siberia and other remote parts of the Soviet Union in four major waves of deportation between 1939 and 1941. (Note: The exact number of people deported between 1939 and 1941 remains unknown. Estimates vary between 350,000 and more than 1.5 million; Rummel estimates the number at 1.2 million, and Kushner and Knox 1.5 million.) Soviet forces occupied eastern Poland until the summer of 1941 when Germany terminated its earlier pact with the Soviet Union and invaded the Soviet Union under the code name Operation Barbarossa. The area was under German occupation until the Red Army reconquered it in the summer of 1944. An agreement at the Yalta Conference permitted the Soviet Union to annex territories close to the Curzon Line (which almost coincided with all of their Molotov–Ribbentrop Pact portion of the Second Polish Republic), compensating the Polish People's Republic with the greater southern part of East Prussia and territories east of the Oder–Neisse line. The Soviet Union appended the annexed territories to the Ukrainian, Byelorussian and Lithuanian Soviet Socialist Republics.

Following the end of World War II in Europe, the Soviet Union signed the Polish–Soviet border agreement of August 1945 with the new, internationally recognized Polish Provisional Government of National Unity on 16 August 1945. This agreement recognized the status quo as the new official border between the two countries, with the exception of the region around Białystok and a minor part of Galicia east of the San River around Przemyśl, which were later returned to Poland.

== Prelude ==
In early 1939, several months before the invasion, the Soviet Union began strategic alliance negotiations with the United Kingdom and France against the crash militarization of Nazi Germany under Adolf Hitler.

Joseph Stalin pursued the Molotov–Ribbentrop Pact with Adolf Hitler, which was signed on 23 August 1939. This non-aggression pact contained a secret protocol, that drew up the division of Northern and Eastern Europe into German and Soviet spheres of influence in the event of war. One week after the signing of the Molotov–Ribbentrop Pact, German forces invaded Poland from the west, north, and south on 1 September 1939. Polish forces gradually withdrew to the southeast where they prepared for a long defense of the Romanian Bridgehead and awaited the French and British support and relief that they were expecting, but neither the French nor the British came to their rescue. On 17 September 1939 the Soviet Red Army invaded the Kresy regions in accordance with the secret protocol. (Note: The Soviet Union was reluctant to intervene until the fall of Warsaw to the Germans. The actual attack was delayed for more than a week after the decision to invade Poland was already communicated to the German ambassador Friedrich Werner von der Schulenburg on 9 September. The Soviet zone of influence according to the pact was carved out through tactical operations.)

At the opening of hostilities several Polish cities including Dubno, Łuck and Włodzimierz Wołyński let the Red Army in peacefully, convinced that it was marching on in order to fight the Germans. General Juliusz Rómmel of the Polish Army issued an unauthorised order to treat them like an ally before it was too late. The Soviet government announced it was acting to protect the Ukrainians and Belarusians who lived in the eastern part of Poland, because the Polish state had collapsed – according to Soviet propaganda, which perfectly echoed Western sentiment that coined the term "Blitzkrieg" to describe Germany's "lightning war" crushing defeat of Poland after just weeks of battle – and could no longer guarantee the security of its citizens. Facing a second front, the Polish government concluded that the defense of the Romanian Bridgehead was no longer feasible and ordered an emergency evacuation of all uniformed troops to then-neutral Romania.

== Poland between the two world wars ==
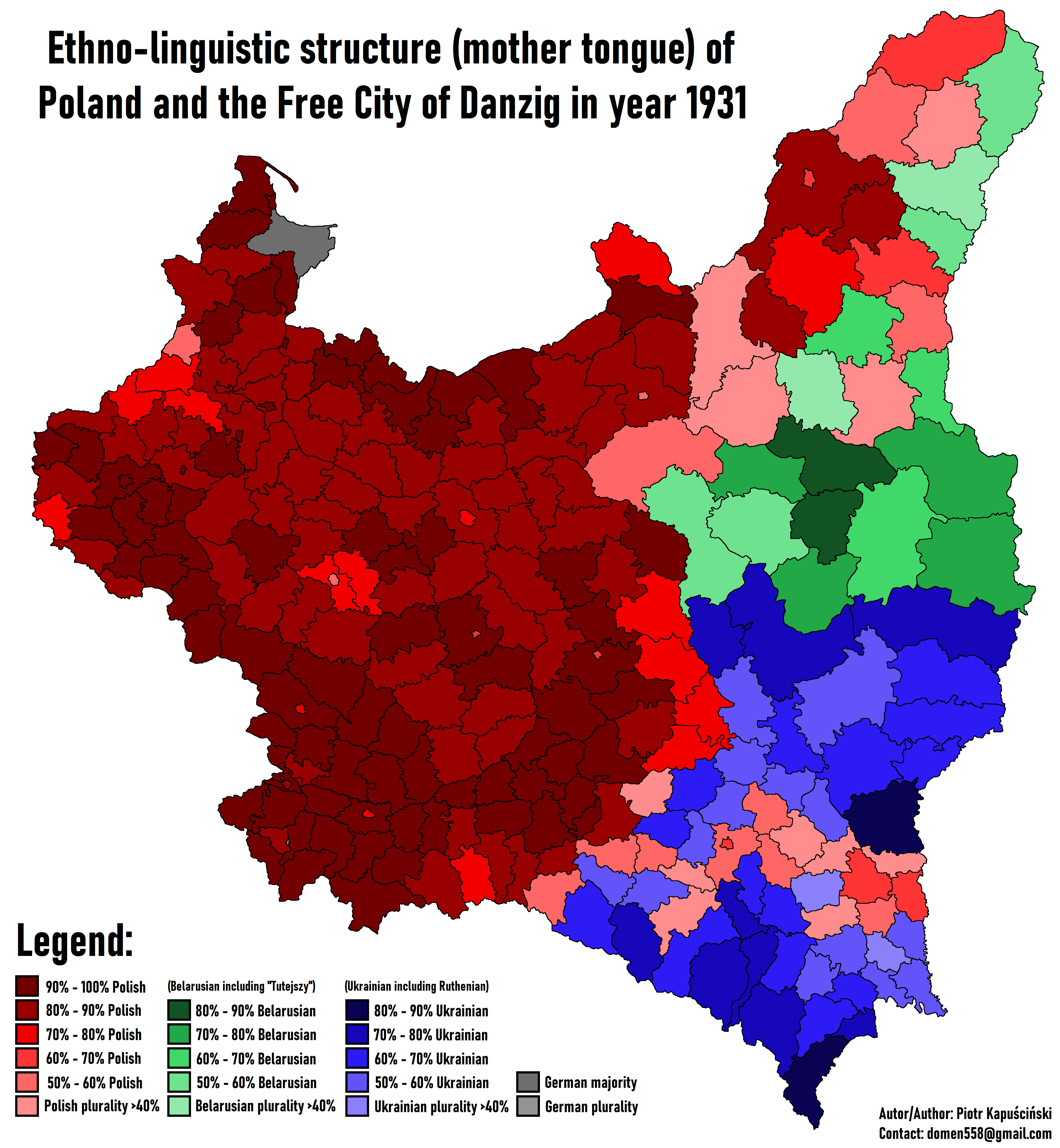
Linguistic map of Poland according to the 1931 Polish census.

The League of Nations and the peace treaties of the 1919 Paris Peace Conference did not, as it had been hoped, help to promote ideas of reconciliation along European ethnic lines. Epidemic nationalism, fierce political resentment in Central Europe (Germany, Austria, Hungary) where there was strong popular resentment to the War Guilt Clause, and post-colonial chauvinism (Italy) led to frenzied revanchism and territorial ambitions. Józef Piłsudski sought to expand the Polish borders as far east as possible in an attempt to create a Polish-led federation, capable of countering future imperialist action on the part of Russia or Germany. By 1920 the Bolsheviks had emerged victorious from the Russian Civil War and, de facto acquired exclusive control over the government and the regional administration. After all foreign interventions had been repelled, the Red Army, commanded by Trotsky and Stalin (among others) started to advance westward towards the disputed territories intending to encourage Communist movements in Western Europe. The Red Army eventually advanced deep into Ukraine and Belarus, and the embattled Ukrainian People's Republic sought military help from Poland to repel the invasion. The joint Polish-Ukrainian armies initially successfully captured the Ukrainian capital, Kyiv, but eventually had to retreat following a massive counteroffensive by the Red Army, culminating in the Polish–Soviet War of 1920. Following the Polish victory upon the Battle of Warsaw, the Soviets sued for peace and the war ended with an armistice in October 1920. The parties signed a formal peace treaty, the Peace of Riga, on 18 March 1921, dividing the disputed territories between Poland and Soviet Russia. In an action that largely determined the Soviet-Polish border during the interwar period, the Soviets offered the Polish peace delegation territorial concessions in the contested borderland areas, that closely resembled the border between the Russian Empire and the Polish–Lithuanian Commonwealth before the first partition of 1772. In the aftermath of the peace agreement, the Soviet leaders steadily abandoned the idea of international Communist revolution and did not return to the concept for approximately 20 years. The Conference of Ambassadors and the international community (with the exception of Lithuania) recognized Poland's eastern frontiers in 1923.

=== Treaty negotiations ===
Planned and actual divisions of Poland, according to the Molotov–Ribbentrop Pact

German troops occupied Prague on 15 March 1939. In mid-April, the Soviet Union, Britain and France began trading diplomatic suggestions regarding a political and military agreement to counter potential further German aggression. Poland did not participate in these talks. The tripartite discussions focused on possible guarantees to participating countries should German expansionism continue. The Soviets did not trust the British or the French to honour a collective security agreement, because they had refused to react against the Nationalists during the Spanish Civil War and let the occupation of Czechoslovakia happen without effective opposition. The Soviet Union also suspected that Britain and France would seek to remain on the sidelines during any potential Nazi-Soviet conflict. Robert C. Grogin (author of Natural Enemies) contends that Stalin, had been "putting out feelers to the Nazis" through his personal emissaries as early as 1936 and desired a mutual understanding with Hitler as a diplomatic solution. The Soviet leader sought nothing short of an ironclad guarantee against losing his sphere of influence, and aspired to create a north–south buffer zone from Finland to Romania, conveniently established in the event of an attack. The Soviets demanded the right to enter these countries in case of a security threat. Talks on military matters, that had begun in mid-August, quickly stalled over the topic of Soviet troop passage through Poland in the event of a German attack. British and French officials pressured the Polish government to agree to the Soviet terms. However, Polish officials bluntly refused to allow Soviet troops to enter Polish territory upon expressing grave concerns that once Red Army troops had set foot on Polish soil, they might decline demands to leave. Thereupon Soviet officials suggested that Poland's objections be ignored and that the tripartite agreements be concluded. The British refused the proposal, fearing that such a move would encourage Poland to establish stronger bilateral relations with Germany.

German officials had secretly been forwarding hints towards Soviet channels for months already, alluding that more favourable terms in a political agreement would be offered than Britain and France. The Soviet Union had meanwhile started discussions with Nazi Germany regarding the establishment of an economic agreement while concurrently negotiating with those of the tripartite group. By late July and early August 1939, Soviet and German diplomats had reached a near-complete consensus on the details for a planned economic agreement and addressed the potential for a desirable political accord. On 19 August 1939, German and Soviet officials concluded the 1939 German–Soviet Commercial Agreement, a mutually beneficial economic treaty that envisaged the trade and exchange of Soviet raw materials for German weapons, military technology and civilian machinery. Two days later, the Soviet Union suspended the tripartite military talks. On 24 August, the Soviet Union and Germany signed the political and military arrangements following the trade agreement, in the Molotov–Ribbentrop Pact. This pact included terms of mutual non-aggression and contained secret protocols, that regulated detailed plans for the division of the states of northern and eastern Europe into German and Soviet spheres of influence. The Soviet sphere initially included Latvia, Estonia and Finland. (Note: On 28 September, the borders were redefined by adding the area between the Vistula and Bug rivers to the German sphere and moving Lithuania into the Soviet sphere.) Germany and the Soviet Union would partition Poland. The territories east of the Pisa, Narev, Vistula, and San rivers would fall to the Soviet Union. The pact also provided designs for the Soviet participation in the invasion, that included the opportunity to regain territories ceded to Poland in the Peace of Riga of 1921. The Soviet planners would enlarge the Ukrainian and Belarusian republics to subjugate the entire eastern half of Poland without the threat of disagreement with Adolf Hitler.

One day after the German-Soviet pact had been signed, French and British military delegations urgently requested a meeting with Soviet military negotiator Kliment Voroshilov. On 25 August Voroshilov acknowledged, that "in view of the changed political situation, no useful purpose can be served in continuing the conversation." On the same day, however, Britain and Poland signed the British-Polish Pact of Mutual Assistance, which adjudicated, that Britain commit itself to defend and preserve Poland's sovereignty and independence.

== German invasion of Poland and Soviet preparations ==
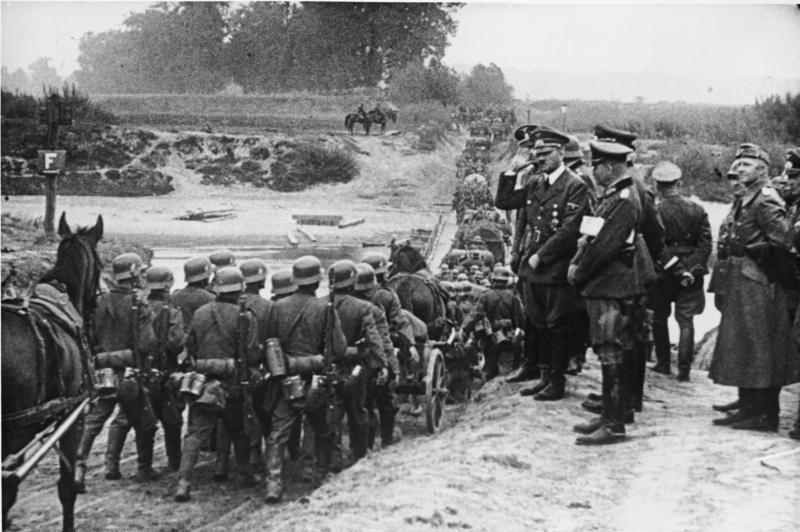
Hitler watching German soldiers marching into Poland in September 1939

Hitler tried to dissuade Britain and France from interfering in the forthcoming conflict and on 26 August 1939 proposed to make Wehrmacht forces available to Britain in the future. At midnight of 29 August,German Foreign Minister Joachim von Ribbentrop handed British Ambassador Nevile Henderson a list of terms that would allegedly ensure peace with regard to Poland. Under the terms, Poland was to hand over Danzig (Gdańsk) to Germany and within a year there was a plebiscite (referendum) to be held in the Polish Corridor, based on residency and demography of the year 1919. When the Polish Ambassador Lipski, who met Ribbentrop on 30 August, declared that he did not have the authority to approve of these demands on his own, Ribbentrop dismissed him and his foreign office announced that Poland had rejected the German offer and further negotiations with Poland were abandoned. On 31 August, in a false flag operation German units, posing as regular Polish troops, staged the Gleiwitz incident near the border town of Gleiwitz in Silesia. On the following day (1 September) Hitler announced, that official military actions against Poland had commenced at 4:45 a.m. German air forces bombarded the cities Lwow and Łuck. Polish security service personnel carried out arrests among Ukrainian intelligentsia in Lwow and Przemysl.

On 1 September 1939 at 11:00 a.m. Moscow time, the counselor of the German embassy in Moscow, Gustav Hilger arrived at the People's Commissariat of Foreign Affairs and formally annunciated the beginning of the German–Polish War, the annexation of Danzig (Gdańsk) as he conveyed a request of the chief of the OKL General Staff that the radio station in Minsk provide signal support. The Soviet side partially adhered to the request. On the same day an extraordinary session of the Supreme Soviet of the Soviet Union confirmed the adoption of its "Universal Military Duty Act for males aged 17 years and 8 months old", by which the service draft act of 1937 was extended for another year. Furthermore, the Politburo of the Communist Party approved the proposal of the People's Commissariat of Defense, which envisaged that the Red Army's existing 51 rifle divisions were to be supplemented to a total strength of 76 rifle divisions of 6,000 men, plus 13 mountain divisions and another 33 ordinary rifle divisions of 3,000 men.

On 2 September 1939 the German Army Group North carried out a maneuver to envelop the forces of the Polish (Pomorze Army) that defended the "Polish Corridor", with the result that the Polish commander General Władysław Bortnowski lost communication with his divisions. The break-through of armored contingents of the German Army Group South near the city of Częstochowa sought to defeat the Polish 6th Infantry Division south of Katowice where the German 5th Armored Division had broken through towards Oświęcim, that captured fuel depots and seized equipment warehouses. To the east detachments of 18th corps of the German 14th Army crossed the Polish–Slovak border near Dukla Pass. The government of the Soviet Union issued directive No. 1355-279сс that approved of the "Reorganization plan of the Red Army ground forces of 1939–1940", which regulated detailed division transfers and updated territorial deployment plans for all the 173 future Red Army combat divisions. In addition to the reorganized infantry, the number of corps artillery and the reserve of the Supreme High Command artillery was increased while the number of service units, rear units and institutions was to be reduced. By the evening of 2 September enhanced defense and security measures were implemented at the Polish–Soviet border. Per instruction No. 1720 of the border troop commander in the Belorussian Military District, all detachments were set to permanent combat-ready status.

The governments of allied Britain and France declared war on Germany on 3 September, but neither undertook agreed-upon military action nor provided any substantial support for Poland. Despite notable Polish success in local border battles, German technical, operational and numerical superiority eventually required the retreat of all Polish forces from the borders towards shorter lines of defense at Warsaw and Lwów. On the same day (3 September), the new Soviet Ambassador in Berlin Aleksei Shkvartsev handed his letter of credence to Adolf Hitler. During the initiation ceremony Shkvartsev and Hitler reassured each other on their commitment to fulfill the terms of the non-aggression agreement. Foreign minister Joachim von Ribbentrop commissioned the German Embassy in Moscow with the assessment of and the report on the likelihood of Soviet intentions for a Red Army invasion into Poland.

On 4 September 1939 all German navy units in the northern Atlantic Ocean received order "to follow to Murmansk, via the northernmost course". On the same day, the Central Committee of the Communist Party and the government of the Soviet Union approved of the People's Commissar of Defense Kliment Voroshilov's orders to delay retirement and dismissal of Red Army personnel and young commanders for one month and to initiate full-scale training for all air defense detachments and staff in Leningrad, Moscow, Kharkov, in Belorussia and the Kiev Military District.

On 5 September 1939 the People's Commissar of Foreign Affairs Vyacheslav Molotov received the German Ambassador Friedrich Werner von der Schulenburg. Upon the ambassador's inquiry with regards to a possible deployment of the Red Army into Poland, Molotov answered that the Soviet government "will definitely have to... start specific actions" at the right time. "But we believe that this moment has not yet come" and "any haste may ruin things and facilitate the rallying of opponents".

On 10 September, the Polish commander-in-chief, Marshal Edward Rydz-Śmigły, ordered a general retreat to the southeast towards the Romanian Bridgehead. Soon after, Nazi German officials further urged their Soviet counterparts to uphold their agreed-upon part and attack Poland from the east. Molotov and ambassador von der Schulenburg discussed the matter repeatedly but the Soviet Union nevertheless delayed the invasion of eastern Poland, while being occupied with events unfolding in the Far East in relation to the ongoing border disputes with Japan. The Soviet Union needed time to mobilize the Red Army and utilized the diplomatic advantage of waiting to attack after Poland had disintegrated.

On 14 September, with Poland's collapse at hand, the first statements on a conflict with Poland appeared in the Soviet press. The undeclared war between the Soviet Union and the Empire of Japan at the Battles of Khalkhin Gol had ended with the Molotov–Tojo agreement, signed on 15 September as a ceasefire took effect on 16 September. On 17 September, Molotov delivered a declaration of war to Wacław Grzybowski, the Polish Ambassador in Moscow:

Warsaw, as the capital of Poland, no longer exists. The Polish Government has disintegrated, and no longer shows any sign of operation. This means that the Polish State and its Government have, de facto, ceased to exist. Accordingly, the agreements concluded between the USSR and Poland have thus lost their validity. Left to her own devices and bereft of leadership, Poland has become a suitable field for all kinds of hazards and surprises, which may constitute a threat to the USSR. For these reasons the Soviet Government, who has hitherto been neutral, can no longer preserve a neutral attitude and ignore these facts. ... Under these circumstances, the Soviet Government has directed the High Command of the Red Army to order troops to cross the frontier and to take under their protection the life and property of the population of Western Ukraine and Western Belarus. — People's Commissar for Foreign Affairs of the U.S.S.R. V. Molotov, 17 September 1939

Molotov declared via public radio broadcast that all treaties between the Soviet Union and Poland had become void, that the Polish government had abandoned its people as the Polish state had effectively ceased to exist. On the same day, the Red Army crossed the border into Poland.

== Soviet invasion of Poland ==
=== Before invasion ===
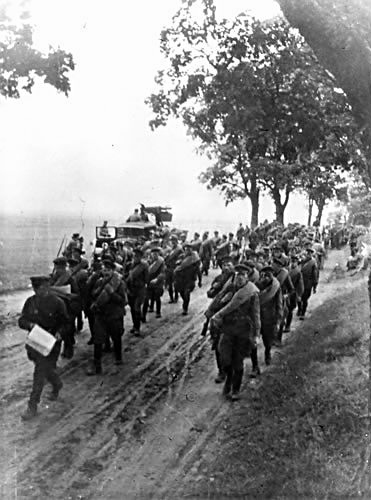
Advancing Red Army troops, Soviet invasion of Poland, 1939

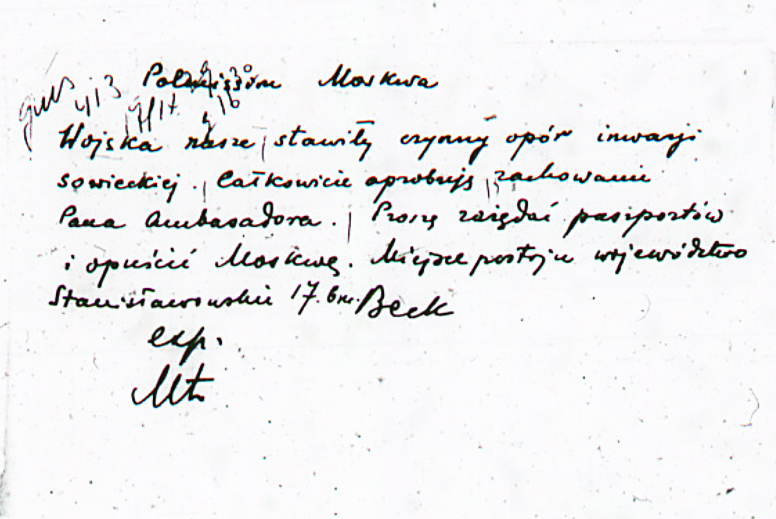
Instructions of Józef Beck, Polish minister of foreign affairs for Wacław Grzybowski, Polish ambassador to the Soviet Union concerning the Soviet invasion of Poland, 17 September 1939

On the morning of 17 September 1939, the Polish administration was still fully operational throughout the entirety of the six easternmost voivodeships, and functioned partly within an additional five voivodeships in eastern Poland as schools remained open in mid-September 1939. Polish Army units concentrated their activities on two areas – on southern (Tomaszów Lubelski, Zamość, Lwów) and central (Warsaw, Modlin, and the Bzura river). Due to determined Polish defense and a lack of fuel, the German advance had stalled and the situation stabilized in the areas east of the line Augustów – Grodno – Białystok – Kobryń – Kowel – Żółkiew – Lwów – Żydaczów – Stryj – Turka. Rail lines were operational in approximately one-third of the territory of the country as both cross-border passenger and cargo traffic was maintained with five neighboring countries (Lithuania, Latvia, Soviet Union, Romania, and Hungary). In Pińsk, assembly of the PZL.37 Łoś planes continued in a PZL factory that had been moved out of Warsaw. A French Navy ship carrying Renault R35 tanks for Poland approached the Romanian port of Constanta. Another ship, with artillery equipment, had just left Marseille. Altogether, seventeen French cargo ships were sailing towards Romania, carrying fifty tanks, twenty airplanes, and large quantities of ammunition and explosives. Several major cities were still in Polish hands, such as Warsaw, Lwów, Wilno, Grodno, Łuck, Tarnopol and Lublin (captured by German troops on 18 September). According to historian and author Leszek Moczulski, approximately 750,000 soldiers remained active in the Polish Army, whereas Czesław Grzelak and Henryk Stańczyk arrived at an estimated strength of 650,000 troops.

On 17 September 1939 the Polish Army, although weakened by weeks of fighting, still was a coherent force. Moczulski asserted, that the Polish Army was still bigger than most European armies and strong enough to fight the Wehrmacht for a long time. On the Baranowicze – Łuniniec – Równe line, rail transport of troops from the northeastern corner of the country towards the Romanian Bridgehead resumed day and night (among these troops were the 35th Reserve Infantry Division under Colonel Jarosław Szafran, the so-called "Grodno Group" ("Grupa grodzieńska") of Colonel Bohdan Hulewicz) and the second largest battle of the September Campaign – the Battle of Tomaszów Lubelski, started on the day of the Soviet invasion. According to Leszek Moczulski, around 250,000 Polish soldiers were fighting in central Poland, 350,000 were getting ready to defend the Romanian Bridgehead, 35,000 were north of Polesie, and 10,000 were fighting on the Baltic coast of Poland, in Hel and in Gdynia. Due to the ongoing battles in the area around Warsaw, Modlin, the Bzura, at Zamość, Lwów and Tomaszów Lubelski, most German divisions had been ordered to fall back towards these locations. The area that remained under control of the Polish authorities encompassed around 140,000 km^{2} (54,000 sq mi) – approximately 200 km (120 mi) wide and 950 km (590 mi) long – from the Daugava in the north to the Carpathian Mountains in the south. Radio Baranowicze and Radio Wilno ceased to broadcast on 16 September after having been bombed by German Luftwaffe units, while Radio Lwów and Radio Warsaw II still aired as of 17 September.

=== Opposing forces ===
A Red Army force of seven field armies with a combined strength between around 450,000 and 1,000,000 troops entered eastern Poland on two fronts. Polish sources give a number of over 800,000. Marshal Semyon Timoshenko commanded the invasion on the Ukrainian Front and General Mikhail Kovalyov led the Red Army on the invasion on the Belarusian Front.

When drawing up the defensive Plan West of 1938, Poland's military strategists assumed the Soviet Union would remain neutral during a conflict with Germany. As a result, Polish commanders focused on massive troop deployment designs and elaborate operational exercises in the west in order to successfully counter all German invasion attempts. This concept, however, would only leave a Border Protection Corps of approximately 20 under-strength battalions with a maximum strength of 20,000 troops assigned to defend the entire eastern border. During the Red Army invasion on 17 September, most Polish units had engaged in a fighting retreat towards the Romanian Bridgehead, where, according to overall strategic plans all divisions were to regroup and await new orders in coordination with allied British and French forces.

=== Military campaign ===
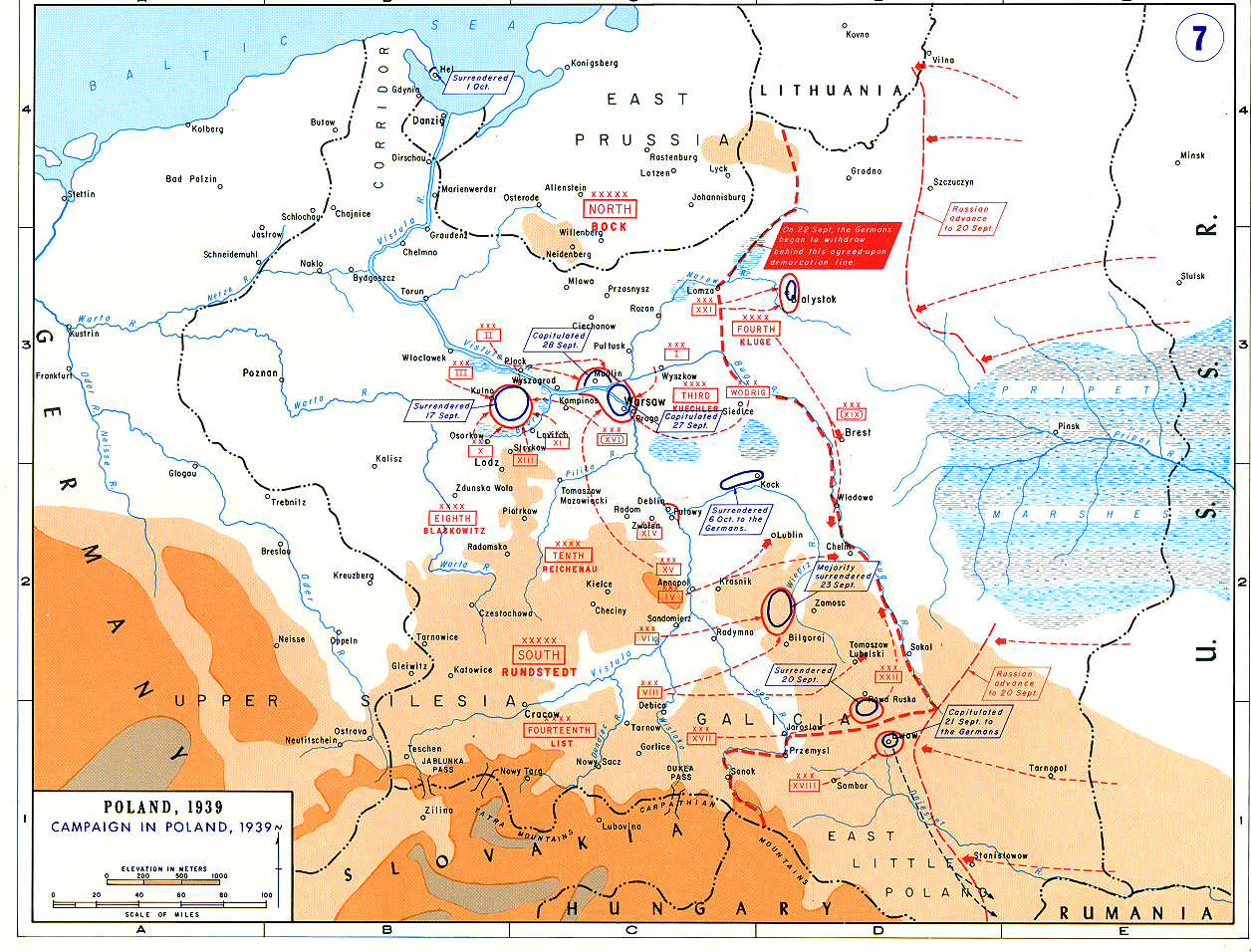
Disposition of all troops following the Soviet invasion

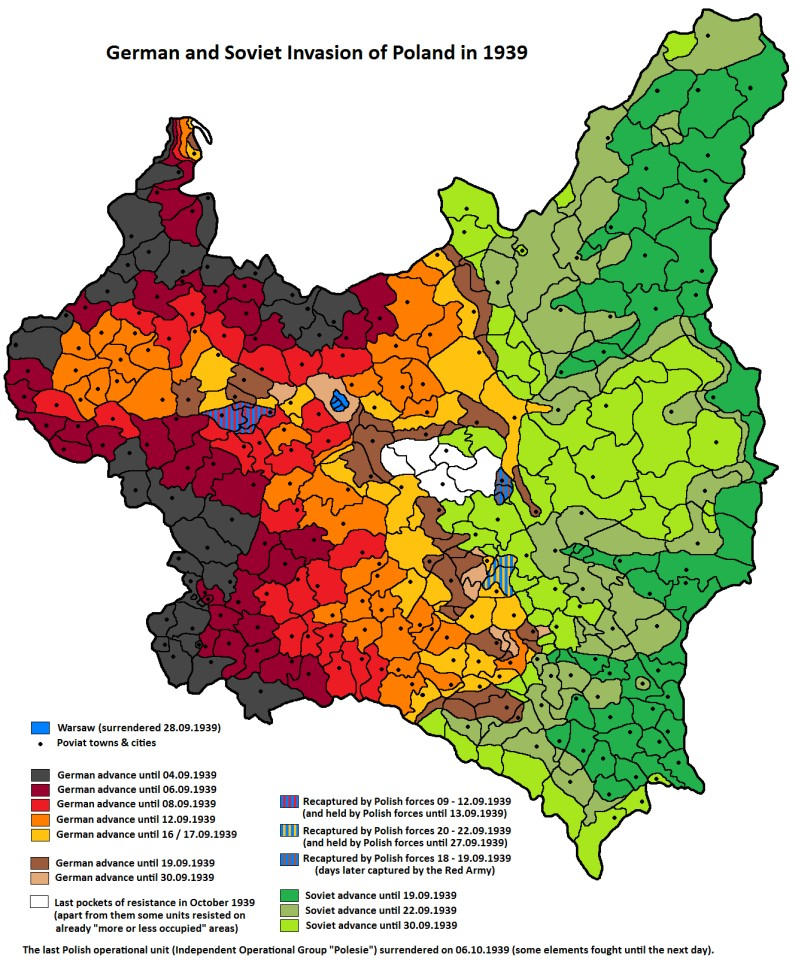
German & Soviet advance in Poland September 1939

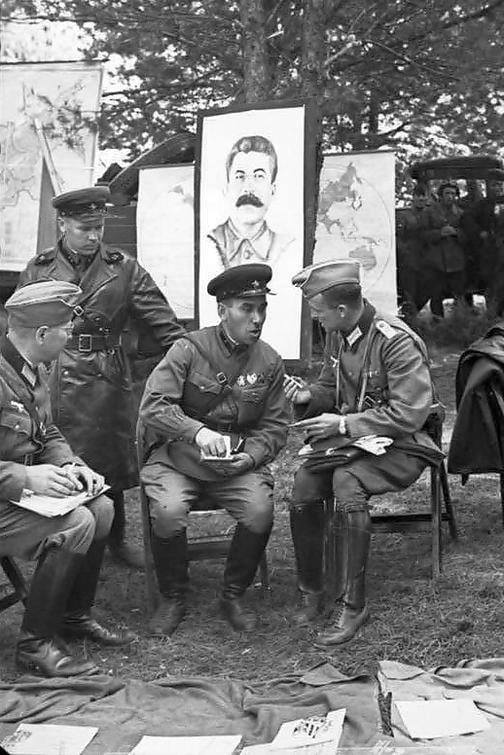
Russian German border, ex Poland 1939.

Commander-in-chief Edward Rydz-Śmigły was initially inclined to order the eastern border forces to oppose the invasion, but was dissuaded by Prime Minister Felicjan Sławoj Składkowski and President Ignacy Mościcki. At 4:00 a.m. on 17 September, Rydz-Śmigły ordered the Polish troops to fall back, stipulating that they only engage Soviet troops in self-defense. However, the German invasion had severely damaged the Polish communication systems and caused command and control problems for the Polish forces. In the resulting confusion, clashes between Polish and Soviet forces occurred along the border. General Wilhelm Orlik-Rückemann, who took command of the Border Protection Corps on 30 August, received no official directives after his appointment. As a result, he and his subordinates continued to actively engage Soviet forces, eventually dissolving the unit on 1 October.

The Polish government refused to surrender or negotiate peace and instead ordered all units to leave Poland and reorganize in France. The day after the Soviet invasion had started, the Polish government withdrew into Romania. Polish units proceeded to manoeuvre towards the Romanian bridgehead area, repulsing German attacks on one flank and clashing occasionally with Soviet troops on the other. In the days following the evacuation order, the Germans defeated the Kraków Army and the Lublin Army at the Battle of Tomaszów Lubelski.

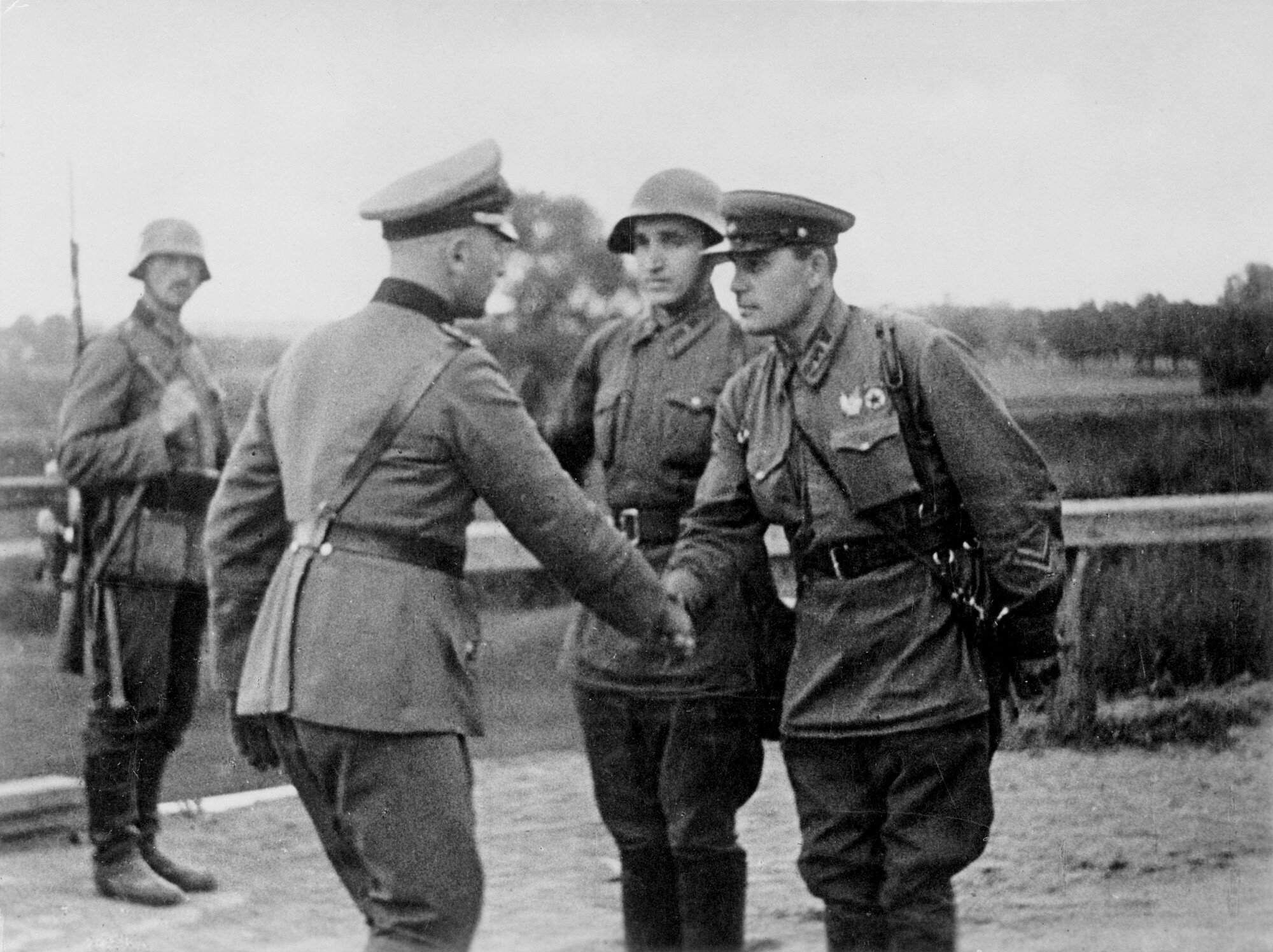
German and Soviet officers shaking hands following the invasion

Soviet units would meet their German counterparts during the advancement from opposite directions. Notable occurrences of co-operation in the field among the two armies were reported, for example, as Wehrmacht troops passed the Brest Fortress, which had been seized after the Battle of Brześć Litewski to the Soviet 29th Tank Brigade on 17 September. German General Heinz Guderian and Soviet Brigadier Semyon Krivoshein on 22 September held a joint parade in the town. Lwów (now Lviv) surrendered on 22 September, several days after German troops had abandoned their siege operation and allowed Soviet forces to take over. Soviet forces took Wilno (now Vilnius) on 19 September after a two-day battle, and Grodno on 24 September after a four-day battle. By 28 September, the Red Army reached the Narew – Western Bug – Vistula – San rivers line – the border that had been agreed upon in advance with Germany.

Despite a tactical Polish victory on 28 September at the Battle of Szack, the outcome of the larger conflict was never in doubt. Civilian volunteers, militia contingents and regrouped army units held out against German forces in and around of the Polish capital, Warsaw, until the end of September, as the Modlin Fortress, north of Warsaw, surrendered after an intense sixteen-day battle. On 1 October, Soviet troops pushed Polish units into the forests at the battle of Wytyczno, during one of the last direct confrontations of the campaign. Several isolated Polish garrisons managed to hold their positions long after being surrounded, such as those in the Volhynian Sarny Fortified Area which only surrendered on 25 September. The last operational unit of the Polish Army was General Franciszek Kleeberg's Independent Operational Group Polesie. Kleeberg surrendered on 6 October after the four-day Battle of Kock, effectively ending the September Campaign. On 31 October, Molotov reported to the Supreme Soviet: "A short blow by the German army, and subsequently (by) the Red Army, was enough for nothing to be left of this (lit.) bastard (state) (Russian: ублюдок), created at the Treaty of Versailles".

=== Domestic reaction ===
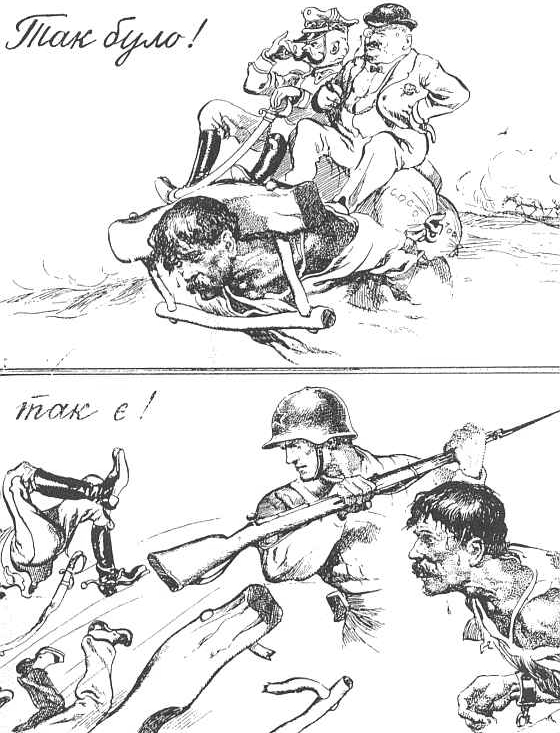
Soviet propaganda appealing to Ukrainian peasants in Eastern Poland

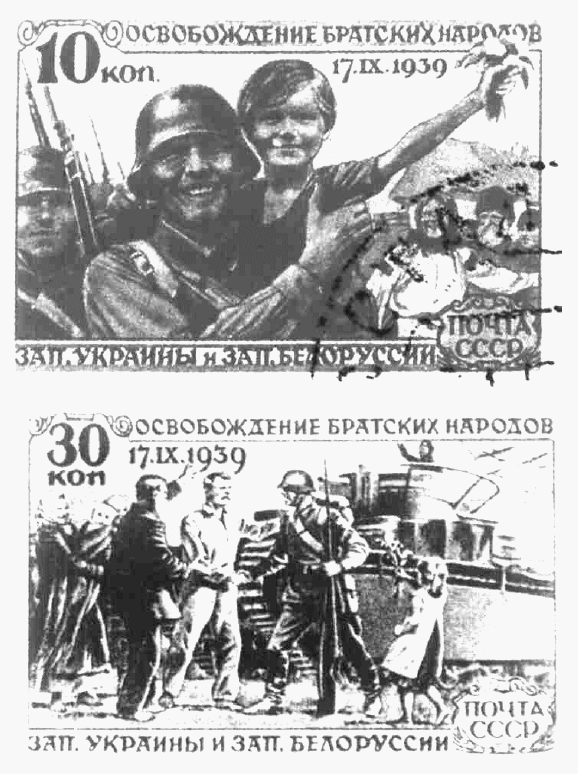
"The liberation of our brothers and sisters in the Western Ukraine and Western Belorussia on 17 September 1939" Postage stamps from the USSR, 1940.

The response of non-ethnic Poles to the situation caused considerable complications. Many Ukrainians, Belarusians and Jews welcomed the invading troops. Local Communists gathered people to welcome the Red Army troops in the traditional Slavic way by presenting bread and salt in the eastern suburb of Brest. A sort of triumphal arch on two poles, decked with spruce branches and flowers was fashioned for this occasion. A slogan in Russian on a long red banner, glorifying the USSR and welcoming the Red Army, crowned the arch. The event was recorded by Lev Mekhlis, who reported to Stalin that the people of the West Ukraine welcomed the Soviet troops "like true liberators". The Organization of Ukrainian Nationalists rebelled against Polish rule and Communist partisans stirred up local revolts, such as in Skidel.

=== International reaction ===
France and Britain refrained from a critical reaction to the Soviet invasion and annexation of Eastern Poland since neither country expected or wanted a confrontation with the Soviet Union at that time. Under the terms of the Polish-British Common Defence Pact of 25 August 1939, Britain had promised assistance if a European power attacked Poland. (Note: The "Agreement of Mutual Assistance between the United Kingdom and Poland" (London, 25 August 1939) states in Article 1: "Should one of the Contracting Parties become engaged in hostilities with a European Power in consequence of aggression by the latter against that Contracting Party, the other Contracting Party will at once give the Contracting Party engaged in hostilities all the support and assistance in its power.") A secret protocol of the pact, however, specified that the European power referred to Germany. When Polish Ambassador Edward Raczyński reminded Foreign Secretary Lord Halifax of the pact, he was bluntly told that it was Britain's exclusive right to declare war on the Soviet Union or not. British Prime Minister Neville Chamberlain considered making a public commitment to restore the Polish state but eventually issued only general condemnations. This stance represented Britain's attempt at balance as its security interests included trade with the USSR that would support its war effort and might lead to a possible future Anglo-Soviet alliance against Germany (which indeed happened two years later). Public opinion in Britain was varied among expressions of outrage at the invasion on the one hand and a perception that Soviet claims in the region were reasonable on the other.

While France had made promises to Poland, including the provision of air support, these were not honoured. A Franco-Polish Military Alliance was signed in 1921 and amended thereafter. The agreements were not strongly supported by the French military leadership and the relationship deteriorated during the 1920s and 1930s. The French correctly considered the German-Soviet alliance to be fragile and overt denunciation of, or action against the Soviet Union would serve neither France's nor Poland's best interests. Once the Soviets had occupied Poland, the French and the British realized there was nothing they could do for Poland on short notice and plans for a long-term victory were devised instead. The French forces, that had advanced tentatively into the Saar region in early September, retreated behind the Maginot Line upon the Polish defeat on 4 October.

On 1 October 1939, Winston Churchill stated in public:

... That the Russian armies should stand on this line was clearly necessary for the safety of Russia against the Nazi menace. At any rate, the line is there, and an Eastern Front has been created which Nazi Germany does not dare assail. When Herr von Ribbentrop was summoned to Moscow last week it was to learn the fact, and to accept the fact, that the Nazi designs upon the Baltic States and upon the Ukraine must come to a dead stop.

Since the Molotov-Ribbentrop Pact was not an official alliance, modern scholarship has described the German and Soviet cooperation in the invasion of Poland as co-belligerence.

== Aftermath ==
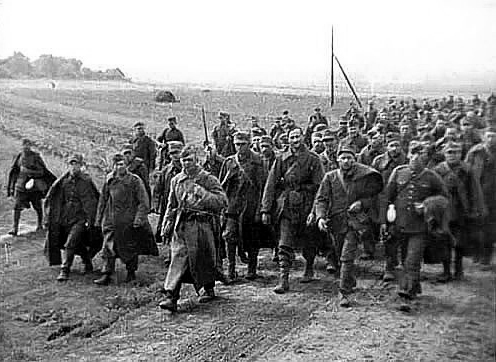
Polish prisoners of war captured by the Red Army during the Soviet invasion of Poland in 1939

In October 1939, Molotov reported to the Supreme Soviet that the Red Army had suffered 737 deaths and 1,862 wounded men during the campaign, a casualty rate that widely contradicted Polish specialist's claims of up to 3,000 deaths and 8,000 to 10,000 wounded. On the Polish side, 3,000 to 7,000 soldiers died fighting the Red Army as between 230,000 and 450,000 men were taken prisoners. The Soviet troops regularly failed to honour commonly accepted terms of surrender. In some cases, after Polish soldiers had been promised to retreat freely Soviet troops arrested them once they had laid down their arms.

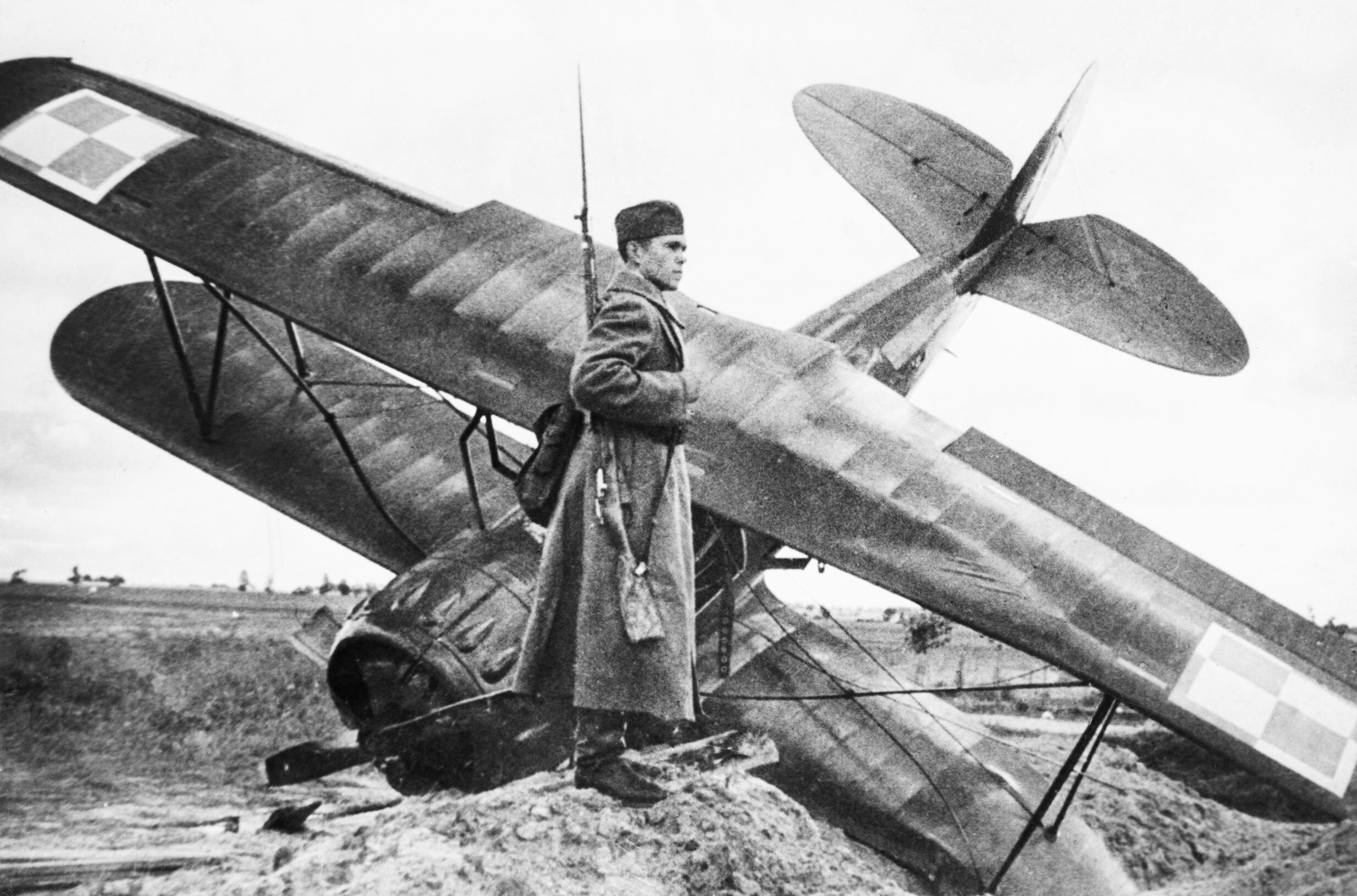
Red Army soldier guarding a Polish PWS-26 trainer aircraft shot down near the city of Równe (Rivne) in the Soviet occupied part of Poland, 18 September 1939

The Soviet Union had ceased to recognise the Polish state upon the start of the invasion. Neither side issued a formal declaration of war. This decision had significant consequences and Rydz-Smigly would be later criticised for it. The Soviets killed tens of thousands of Polish prisoners of war during the campaign itself. On 24 September, the Soviet soldiers killed 42 staff and patients of a Polish military hospital in the village of Grabowiec, near Zamość. Soviet troops also executed all the Polish officers they captured at the Battle of Szack on 28 September 1939. The NKVD killed 22,000 Polish military personnel and civilians in the Katyn massacre in 1940. Torture was widely used by the NKVD in various prisons, especially in small towns.

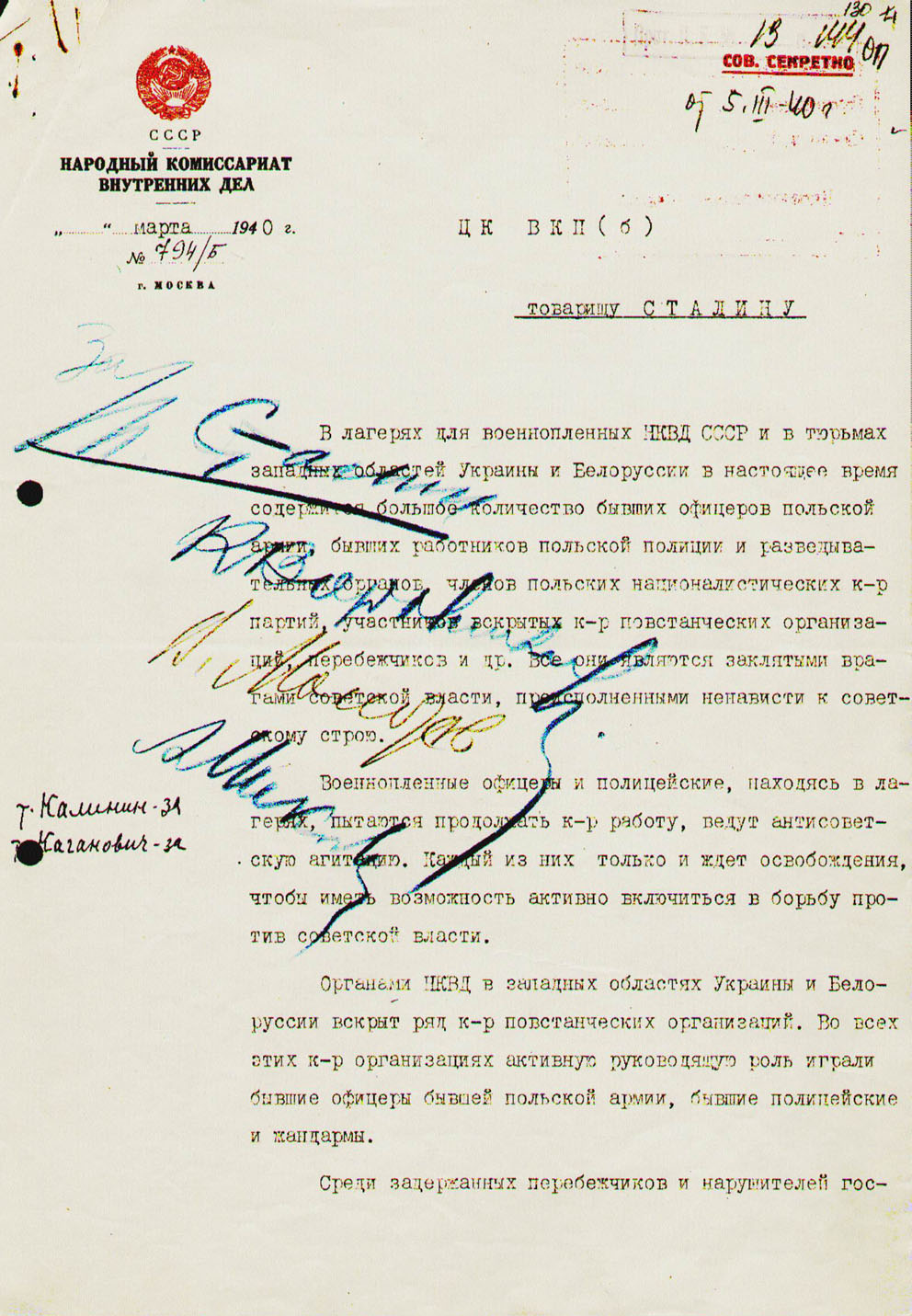
Soviet document, proving the mass execution of Polish officers in the Katyn massacre

On 28 September 1939, the Soviet Union and Germany signed the German–Soviet Treaty of Friendship, Cooperation and Demarcation, readdressing the secret terms of the Molotov–Ribbentrop Pact. Lithuania was incorporated into the Soviet sphere of influence and the border within Poland was shifted to the east, increasing German territory. By this arrangement, often described as a fourth partition of Poland, the Soviet Union secured almost all Polish territory east of the line of the rivers Pisa, Narew, Western Bug and San. This amounted to about 200,000 km^{2} (77,000 sq mi) territory, inhabited by 13.5 million Polish citizens. The border created in this agreement roughly corresponded to the Curzon Line drawn by the British in 1919, a point that would successfully be utilized by Stalin during negotiations with the Allies at the Teheran and Yalta Conferences. The Red Army had originally sown confusion among the population, claiming that they had come to save Poland from Nazi occupation. Their advance surprised Polish communities and their leaders, who had not been advised on how to respond to a Soviet invasion. Polish and Jewish citizens might initially have preferred Soviet rule to Nazi German rule. However, the Soviet authorities quickly imposed Communist ideology and administration upon their new subjects and suppressed the traditional ways of life. For instance, the Soviet government confiscated, nationalized and redistributed all private Polish property. During the two years following the annexation, the Soviet police forces arrested approximately 100,000 Polish citizens.

The Poles and the Soviets re-established diplomatic relations in 1941, following the Sikorski–Mayski agreement. The Soviets broke off talks again in 1943 after the Polish government had demanded an independent examination of the recently discovered Katyn burial pits (Katyn massacre).

Due to denied access to secret Soviet archives, estimates of the number of Polish citizens deported to Siberia and the total number of perished persons under Soviet rule, remained guesswork for decades after the end of the war. Estimates among the numerous publications varied between 350,000 and 1,500,000 for civilians deported to Siberia and between 250,000 and 1,000,000 for the total number of civilians who had died. With the opening of the Soviet secret archives after 1989, more realistic and potentially smaller numbers were established. In August 2009, on the occasion of the 70th anniversary of the Soviet invasion, the Polish Institute of National Remembrance announced that research estimates on the number of people deported to Siberia and those who had perished under Soviet wartime rule amounted to around a total of 150,000 Polish citizens.

=== Belorussia and Ukraine ===
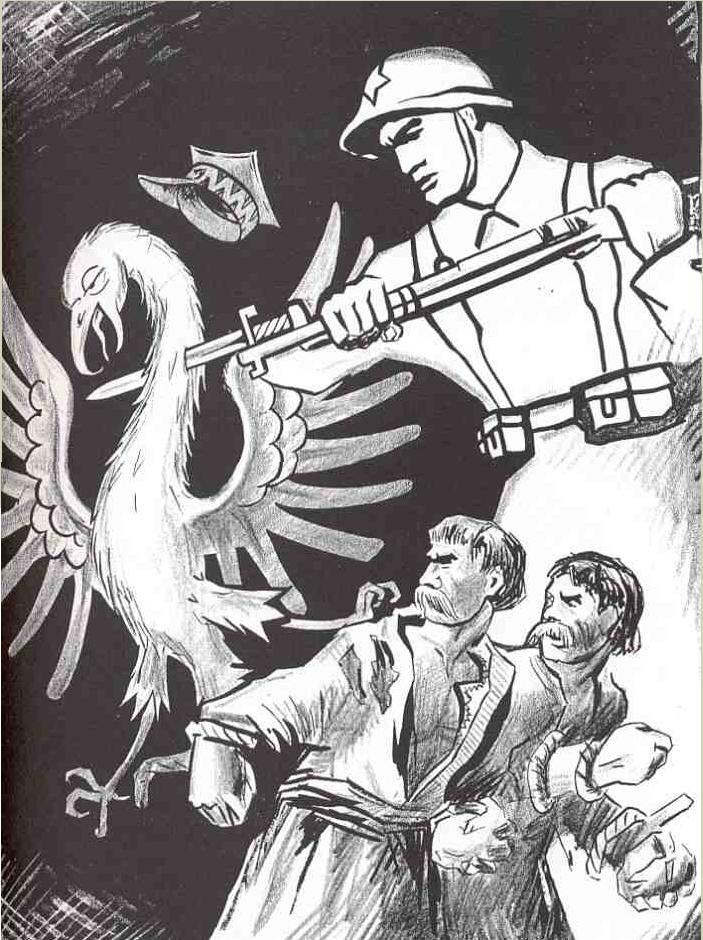
Soviet propaganda depicting the Red Army as the liberator of Ukrainian and Belarusian peasants from Polish tyranny (the Polish eagle)

According to the last official Polish census the 13.5 million inhabitants in the newly annexed territories consisted of 38% Poles (5,1 million), 37% Ukrainians (4,7 million), 14.5% Belarusians, 8.4% Jews, 0.9% Russians and 0.6% Germans.

The elections of 26 October in the Belorussian and Ukrainian communities were utilized to bestow some degree of legitimacy upon the annexation. (Note: The voters were presented with just one candidate for each position of deputy. The Communist party commissars subsequently would press their resolutions in the communities towards complete nationalization of the financial sector and the heavy industries and the transfer of private land to agricultural communities.) The Belarusians and Ukrainians in Poland had been alienated by the former Polonization policies of the Polish government and the repression of separatist movements and thus felt little loyalty towards the Polish cause. Not all Belarusians and Ukrainians, however, trusted the Soviet regime. In practice, the poor generally welcomed the Soviets, and the elites tended to join the opposition, despite supporting the reunification itself. The Soviets eventually introduced complete Sovietization policies in Western Belorussia and Western Ukraine, including compulsory collectivization throughout the whole region. In the process, all political parties and public associations were ruthlessly destroyed and their leaders imprisoned or executed as "enemies of the people". The Soviet authorities also suppressed the anti-Polish Organization of Ukrainian Nationalists for an independent and undivided Ukrainian state, that had actively resisted the Polish regime since the 1920s. The unifications of 1939 nevertheless proved to be decisive events in the history of Ukraine and Belarus, as these created the precursors to the two republics, that eventually achieved independence after the fall of the Soviet Union in 1991.

== In communist and Russian propaganda ==
=== Communist era ===
Politburo jargon would stylize the invasion a "liberation campaign" from its inception. The term would consequently be utilized throughout Soviet history among official references and publications. Despite the 1979 publication of a recovered copy of the secret protocols of the Molotov–Ribbentrop Pact in the Western media, the Soviet Union continued to deny their existence until 1989. Attempts to record the factual and fully detailed history of the 1939 Soviet invasion and its consequences have only been made after the fall of the USSR. Soviet censorship and inaccessible archives prevented serious historic research until 1991. Censorship was also applied in the People's Republic of Poland in order to preserve the image of "Polish-Soviet friendship" which was promoted by the two communist governments. Accounts of the 1939 campaign were to portray the invasion in accord with the Soviet Politburo narrative – a reunification of the Belarusian and Ukrainian peoples and the liberation of the Polish people from "Oligarchic Capitalism". The authorities strongly discouraged any study in depth and the teaching of the subject. Various underground publishers and artists addressed the issue, as in the 1982 protest song "Ballada wrześniowa" by Jacek Kaczmarski.

=== In Russia ===
In a 2009 letter to the Polish daily newspaper Gazeta Wyborcza, Russian Prime Minister Vladimir Putin stated that the Molotov–Ribbentrop Pact of August 1939 was "immoral". In 2015, however, as President of the Russian Federation, he commented: "In this sense I share the opinion of our culture minister (Vladimir Medinsky praising the pact as a triumph of Stalin's diplomacy) that this pact had significance for ensuring the security of the USSR".

In 2016, the Russian Supreme Court upheld the sentence of a lower court that had found blogger Vladimir Luzgin guilty of the "rehabilitation of Nazism" after he had posted a text on social media that characterized the invasion of Poland in 1939 as a joint effort by Nazi Germany and the Soviet Union.

On 17 September 2021, Russia's Foreign Ministry marked the 82nd anniversary of the Soviet invasion of Poland with a Twitter post describing it as a "campaign of liberation", stating that "...peoples of Western Belorussia and Western Ukraine greeted the Soviet soldiers with rejoicing".

== See also ==
- Cursed soldiers 1944–1947
- Evacuation of Polish civilians from the USSR in World War II
- Germany–Soviet Union relations, 1918–1941
- History of Poland (1939–1945)
- Polish Operation of the NKVD 1937–1938
- Russian involvement in regime change
- Soviet repressions of Polish citizens (1939–1946)
- List of German military equipment of World War II
- List of Soviet Union military equipment of World War II
- List of World War II military equipment of Poland
