= Vishnyavyets rural council =

Vishnyavecki rural council (Belarusian: Вішнявецкі сельсаветRussian: Вишневецкий сельсовет) is a lower-level subdivision (selsoviet) of Stowbtsy district, Minsk region, Belarus. The center is the agrotown of Vishnyavyets.

The population from the 2009 Belarusian census and 2019 Belarusian census was 2,139 and 1,791 respectively.
