= Litvyenski rural council =

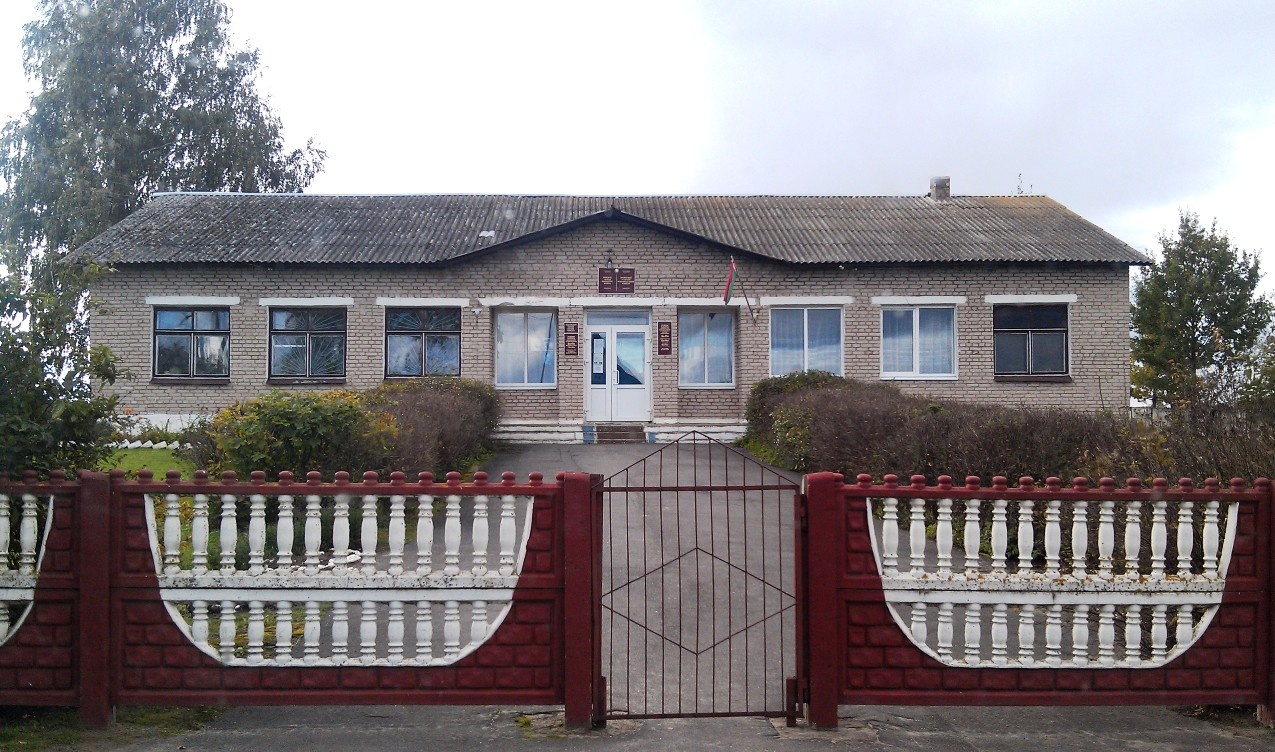
Building in Litva, Belarus

Litwyenski rural council is a lower-level subdivision (selsoviet) of Stowbtsy district, Minsk region, Belarus.
