= Soviet raid on Stołpce =

1924 border incident in Poland

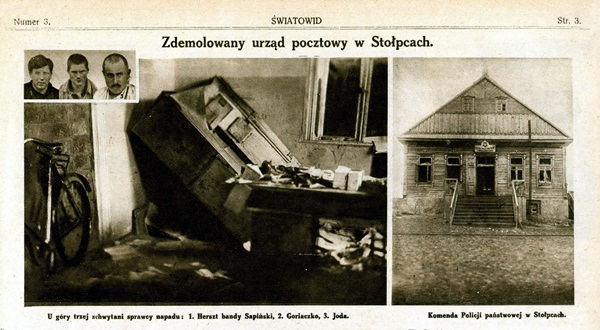
Article about a Soviet raid on Stołpce in a Polish newspaper

On the night of August 3/4, 1924, when a group of 150 Soviet agents, commanded by Lieutenant Boryshkevich, raided the town of Stołpce (now Stowbtsy, Belarus), which back then was a railroad border crossing between the Second Polish Republic and the Soviet Union. The raid ended in temporary capture of the town, and destruction of a police station, railroad station, and several houses.

== Background ==
After the Polish–Soviet War, the border between the two countries was established roughly along the 1400-kilometer line going from the Daugava in the north, to the Dniester in the south, east of the line marked by the towns of Wilejka, Baranowicze, Luniniec, Sarny, Rowne, and Brody. The town of Stołpce therefore became part of the Second Polish Republic, and it was a border rail station along the main European rail line from Paris to Moscow via Berlin, Warsaw, and Minsk.

The newly established Polish–Soviet border was marred by violence from the beginning. The Soviets regarded it as temporary, and, hoping to ignite a revolution in Poland, carried out a guerilla war against the Polish authorities. At the same time, the Poles supported an anti-Soviet Belarusian partisan movement, and Polish Army teams also penetrated into the Soviet area. In one of the most famous incidents of this kind, Soviet agents captured a passenger train from Pinsk to Łuniniec. This event took place on September 24, 1924, near the village of Lowcza, and the Soviets were commanded by Trofim Kalinienko. Among passengers of the train, there were local personalities: the voivode of the Polesie Voivodeship Stanislaw Downarowicz, Roman Catholic Bishop Zygmunt Łoziński of Minsk and Pinsk, and the well-known senator of the Second Polish Republic Boleslaw Wyslouch. After robbing all valuables, the attackers escaped into Soviet territory. Before escaping, Kalinienko handed a “receipt” to the train conductor. It stated: "Ataman Trofim Kalinienko, Headquarters Timkowicze (Now Tsimkavichy, Belarus)."

Originally, the border was guarded by units of the Polish Police, but the situation was getting out of control, and the government in Warsaw knew it had to find a solution. Altogether, in 1924, along the Polish–Soviet border there were some 200 raids, in which around 1,000 Soviet agents participated, and at least 54 people died. Year 1924 was by far the worst, especially summer and autumn. In the night of July 18/19, 1924, some 30 armed Soviet agents attacked the village of Wiszniew, located in Wołożyn county of Nowogródek Voivodeship. During the raid, the perpetrators stole the valuables, and a skirmish ensued, during which commandant of the Polish police station was killed. Raids also took place in Polish part of Volhynia, where manor houses and villages were robbed, and horses were stolen.

The Polish authorities knew well who stood behind these raids and what their real purpose was. In 1925, Colonel Juliusz Ulrych of the freshly created Border Protection Corps (Korpus Ochrony Pogranicza, KOP) wrote: "The Soviets have undertaken the plan to capture eastern lands of Poland, even though there is no official war. They want to use these provinces as a foreground of their struggle, in which the sphere of influence of Russian statehood would dominate over the sphere of influence of Poland. Therefore we witness immense activities of diversionary nature, with widespread Communist groups, willingly supporting banditry."

== Raid on Stołpce ==
The raid on Stołpce, which was described as “uniquely brazen” began on the night of August 3, 1924. It was a well-organized, meticulously planned action, carried out by a group of 150 Soviet agents, divided into four platoons. Apart from handguns and grenades, the perpetrators had three machine guns. Those who were captured by Polish police officers, stated that they had been trained for the mission by Soviet officers in Minsk, the capital of Soviet Belarus.

The purpose of the raid was to free two imprisoned Communist activists. According to some Polish sources, the raid, as well as other incidents of this kind along the border, was organized by Zakordonnyj Otdiel (Zakordot), a Soviet agency created in Moscow in 1920, whose purpose was to destroy eastern Poland. These sources claim that agents of Zakordot carried out the raid, during which they destroyed Stołpce's Police Station, rail station and post office, and kidnapped a number of Polish citizens.

After the raid, the invaders returned to the Soviet Union, but due to the diplomatic consequences of that action, Moscow decided to cease its program of peacetime attacks on its neighbors, preferring to start preparations for wartime sabotage and diversion under the authority of the Red Army's Intelligence Directorate.
