= Wytyczno =

- Village
- Location within Poland
- Coordinates: 51°26′N 23°16′E
- Country: Poland
- Voivodeship: Lublin
- County: Włodawa
- Gmina: Urszulin

Wytyczno [vɨˈtɨt͡ʂnɔ] is a village in the administrative district of Gmina Urszulin, within Włodawa County, Lublin Voivodeship, in eastern Poland.

It was the site of the Battle of Wytyczno between Polish and Soviet forces in October 1939.
