= Battle of Wytyczno =

1939 battle in Poland in WWII

Coordinates: 51°26′00″N 23°16′00″E

- Part of the Soviet Invasion of Poland in the European theatre of World War II
Date	October 1, 1939
Location	Wytyczno, near Włodawa, Poland
Result	Soviet victory

Belligerents
Soviet Union	Poland

Commanders and leaders
(Soviet Union) Vasily Sokolov	(Second Polish Republic) W. Orlik-Rueckemann

Strength
1,200 men 20 guns 70 tanks	2,000 men 13 guns

Casualties and losses
80 killed 102 wounded 4 tanks destroyed	200 killed 467 wounded

The battle of Wytyczno took place on October 1, 1939, near the village of Wytyczno near Włodawa in Poland. It was a struggle between the Polish forces of the Border Defence Corps of General Wilhelm Orlik-Rückemann and the Soviet Red Army during the invasion of Poland.

After the battle of Szack on September 28, the Polish commander decided to cross the Bug River and continue the fight there. After a short rest, on September 30 the Poles had crossed the river. Although largely victorious in most of the fights against the Soviets, the Polish unit was reduced to merely 3,000 men and was lacking heavy equipment and ammunition. In addition, most of the soldiers of the Border Defence Corps had been forced to cross large parts of Poland, with the average unit crossing almost 500 kilometres in two weeks.

After crossing the Włodawa-Trawniki road, shortly after 1 AM on October 1, the Polish unit was attacked by a tank unit of the Soviet 45th Rifle Division. Polish Bofors 37 mm guns opened fire at close range and the Soviet unit withdrew losing four T-26 tanks. Soon after daybreak the Soviets returned, this time with the majority of 45th division's units. The Soviets, expecting the Polish unit to be completely routed and composed entirely of officers, started a frontal assault on the village of Wytyczno. However, the Polish tabors crossed the road into the forest behind the village and placed artillery posts there, which enabled the defending Poles to hold their positions.

The struggle for the village continued, with both sides suffering heavy losses. At 9 AM the Polish 75 mm artillery had no more than 60 shells left and the howitzers had not more than 10 per barrel. To lessen the enemy pressure on the centre of the Polish units, Orlik-Rückemann ordered the Polesie Battalion to attack the left flank of the enemy. However, the soldiers were too tired to start the assault and most of them simply declined to follow the order. Commander of the Sarny Regiment, Col. Nikodem Sulik, reported that the Polish defences were getting weaker with every hour and with all probability the battle would end by dawn with a complete Polish defeat. At 10.30 a war council was held and it was decided that the only option for his men to survive was to withdraw, divide the unit onto smaller detachments and try to break through to the units of Independent Operational Group Polesie fighting nearby. At noon the Polish units successfully withdrew to the forests. Most of them joined the other Polish unit, while Orlik-Rückemann found his way to Great Britain through Lithuania and Sweden.

== See also ==
- List of World War II military equipment of Poland
- List of Soviet Union military equipment of World War II
