= Battle of Szack =

1939 battle of the Soviet invasion of Poland in WWII

Coordinates: 51°29′16″N 23°55′47″E

Battle of Szack (Shatsk)
- Part of the Soviet Invasion of Poland in the European theatre of World War II
Date	28 September 1939
Location	Shatsk, Wołyń Voivodeship Poland (now Ukraine)
Result	Polish victory

Belligerents
Soviet Union	Poland

Commanders and leaders
(Soviet Union) Ivan Russiyanov	(Second Polish Republic) W. Orlik-Rückemann

Strength
52nd Rifle Division	4,000 strong KOP group including artillery

Casualties and losses
Soviet archives: 81 dead 184 wounded 7 tanks (5 T-26, 2 T-38); 2 tractors 3 anti-tank guns (Polish accounts:); ~500 dead 1,600 wounded 300 captured Several guns A few AFVs; Up to 40 tanks	~500 dead 900+ wounded A few trucks

Battle of Szack (Shatsk) was one of the battles between the Polish Army and the Red Army fought in 1939 in the beginning of the Second World War.

== Eve of the battle ==
During the invasion of Poland, the Polish Border Defence Corps (KOP) was severely stripped of all the reserves and heavy armament. All the available Polish forces were sent to the west to reinforce the units resisting the German invasion. When the Red Army invaded Poland starting on 17 September, there were barely any Polish forces to oppose them. The garrisons of the KOP were overstretched and after initial clashes and skirmishes for the border forts, the Polish units had to fall back.

The deputy commander of the KOP, general Wilhelm Orlik-Rueckemann decided to unite as many troops under his command as possible and join with the rest of the Polish forces in the west. He ordered all the KOP forces in Polesie area to withdraw. In several days he managed to gather approximately 9,000 men under his command, coming from various units spread along a 300-kilometre long strip of the Polish-Soviet border. On 19 September he ordered all his units to march towards Kowel, where his forces were to be joined by the Independent Operational Group Polesie under general Franciszek Kleeberg. However, the difficult situation and the outcome of the battles of Brześć and of Kobryń forced Rueckemann's group to change its plans. The Polish units changed the direction and started to march through the forests towards Włodawa and Kamień Koszyrski.

The group found itself in a no-man's-land between the Soviet forces and the Wehrmacht and could operate freely but the morale of the troops was low. On 27 September General Orlik-Rueckemann decided to engage the Soviet forces to achieve a victory and raise morale.

== Battle ==
The Polish forces were marching in two columns. In the early morning of 28 September the northern column reached the forests near the village of Mielniki while the southern column reached the forests east of Szack (now Shatsk). Polish reconnaissance reported that the town of Shatsk was occupied by Soviet infantry and tanks. Orlik-Rueckemann ordered both columns to form a defensive line along the border of the forest and provoked the Red Army to attack.

At 8 o'clock in the morning, the Soviet tank unit (composed mostly of the T-26 tanks) started a direct assault on Polish positions. The Polish forces did not open fire until the tanks came close. When the tanks were only some 500 metres from the Polish lines the Polish Bofors wz. 36 anti-tank guns opened fire. Soon they were joined by the infantry and the 75 mm artillery. All Soviet tanks were destroyed and the battalion of major Balcerzak was ordered to attack the town of Shatsk. The Soviet units were taken by surprise and after a short hand-to-hand fight, the Soviet forces were routed. Only a small part of the motorised infantry managed to retreat but had to leave behind all their lorries, artillery and 9 T-26 tanks. The Poles also captured the staff headquarters.

According to the orders of the Soviet 52nd Rifle Division found in the headquarters, the Soviet units operating from the Kobryń area were to "clean up the area east of Bug River from the bands of Polish officers." At 2 o'clock in the afternoon, Soviet reserve units appeared in the area and Orlik-Rueckemann decided to withdraw his troops to the forests.

== Aftermath ==
The remaining Polish forces withdrew unopposed and started their march towards the Bug River. The only Polish unit destroyed by the Red Army was the tabor of KOP "Polesie" Brigade, caught by surprise near the village of Mielnik by the armoured troops of the Soviet 4th Army under general Vassili Chuikov. After a brief fight, the Polish unit surrendered. Upon the surrender some Polish officers were shot. Polish sources often estimate the number of Polish dead and wounded at 500; including 18 prisoners of war executed in nearby village of Mielniki (Shatsk).

The remaining Polish forces evaded capture and crossed the Bug River, where they took part in the Battle of Wytyczno.

== See also ==
- Border Defence Corps
- List of World War II military equipment of Poland
- List of Soviet Union military equipment of World War II
- Invasion of Poland
