= Wacław Grzybowski =

Polish politician and philosopher

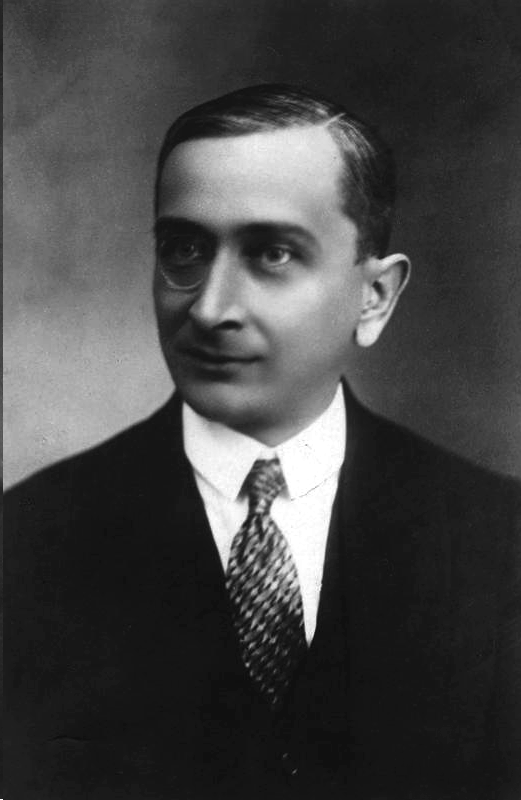

Wacław Grzybowski (1887-1959) was a Polish politician and philosopher. He was a Deputy to the Polish Sejm from 1927 to 1935, and ambassador to the Soviet Union (Moscow) from July 1936 to 17 September 1939. He was summoned and given a note cancelling agreements with Poland prior to its invasion of Poland. Grzybowski refused to accept the note and then emigrated.
