= Stowbtsy =

Town in Minsk Region, Belarus

Stowbtsy Стоўбцы (Belarusian) Столбцы (Russian)
- Town
- Culture center

- Flag Coat of arms

- Location within Belarus
- Coordinates: 53°29′N 26°44′E
- Country: Belarus
- Region: Minsk Region
- District: Stowbtsy District
- First mentioned: 1511

Population (2026)
  - Total: 17,603
- Time zone: GTM +3
- Postal code: 222666
- Area code: +375 1717
- License plate: 5
- Website: http://www.stolbtsy.minsk-region.by/

Stowbtsy or Stolbtsy (Note: Belarusian: Стоўбцы, romanized: Stoŭbcy, IPA: [ˈstowpt͡sɨ]; Russian: Столбцы, IPA: [stɐlˈptsɨ]; Polish: Stołpce; Yiddish: סטויבץ, romanized: Steibtz; Lithuanian: Stolpcai.) is a town in Minsk Region, in west-central Belarus. It serves as the administrative center of Stowbtsy District. It is located on the Neman River. As of 2026, it has a population of 17,603.

== Etymology ==
"Stowbtsy" means "columns" or "posts" in Belarusian. A suggested version for the name origin: once the Neman River was very deep, and sailing boats had to be tied to wooden posts to secure the boats against a strong flow of the river.

== History ==
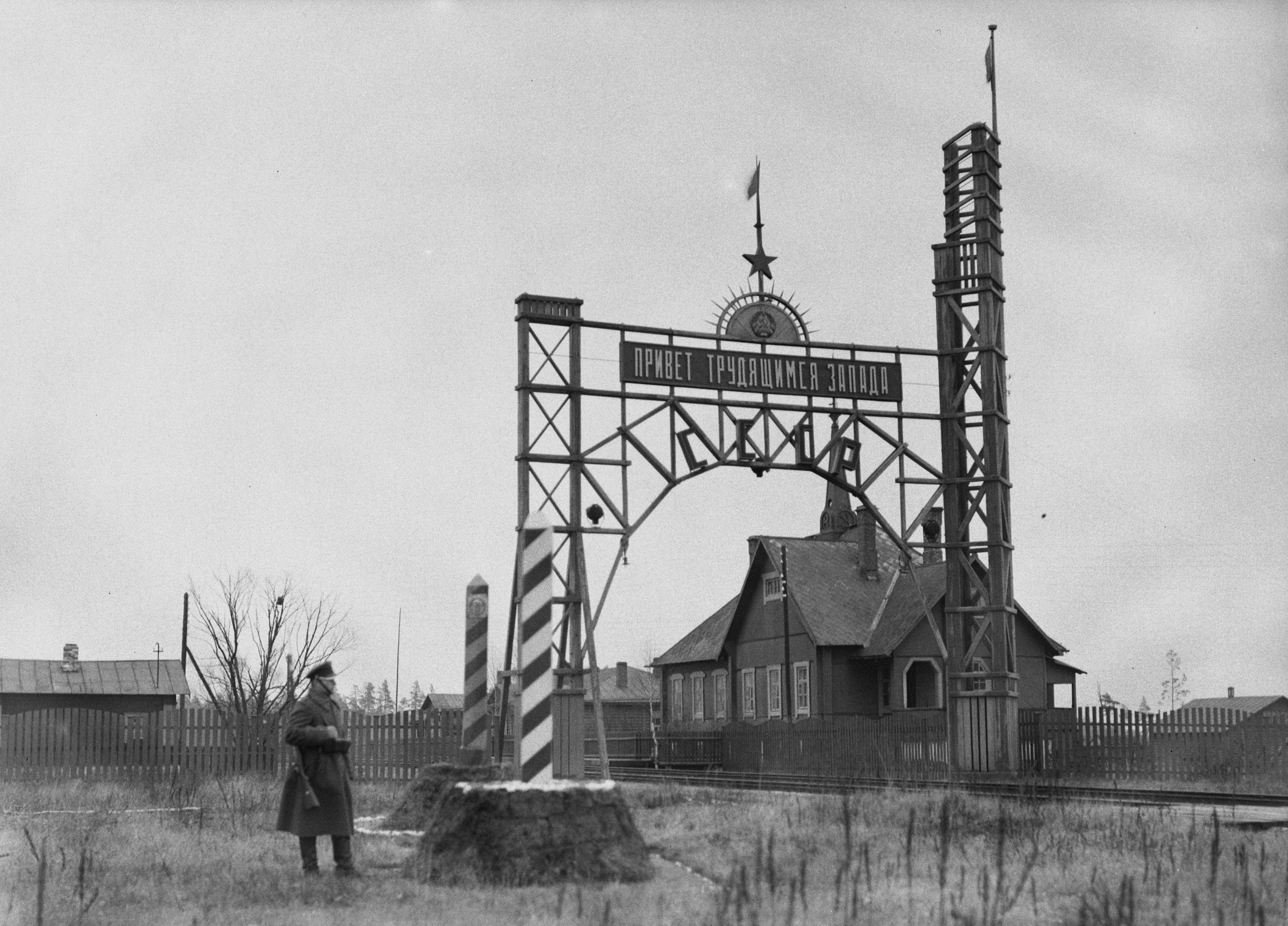
Polish-Soviet borderpost in 1934

The town was founded in 1593. For a long time it was a shtetl with significant Jewish population. It was a private town of the Słuszka noble family of Ostoja coat of arms, administratively located in the Minsk County in the Minsk Voivodeship of the Polish–Lithuanian Commonwealth. Aleksander Słuszka and his wife Zofia founded a church and Dominican monastery in the 17th century. Later, the town passed to the Radziwiłł and Czartoryski families.

In the late-18th-century Partitions of Poland, the town was annexed by Russia. The Orthodox Church of Saint Anne was built in 1825, funded by the Czartoryski family. After the unsuccessful Polish November Uprising, in 1833, the Dominican monastery was closed, and converted into a regular Catholic parish. As of 1867, the town had a population of 2,035. The town was a major regional trading center that declined after the railroad was built in 1871, bypassing the town. This was followed by a mass emigration of Jews to America.

In August 1924, while Stowbtsy was part of the Second Polish Republic, the town was the site of a Soviet-Polish border incident in which a company of Soviet raiders attacked its police station and government building in order to free two imprisoned communist activists (see Soviet raid on Stołpce).

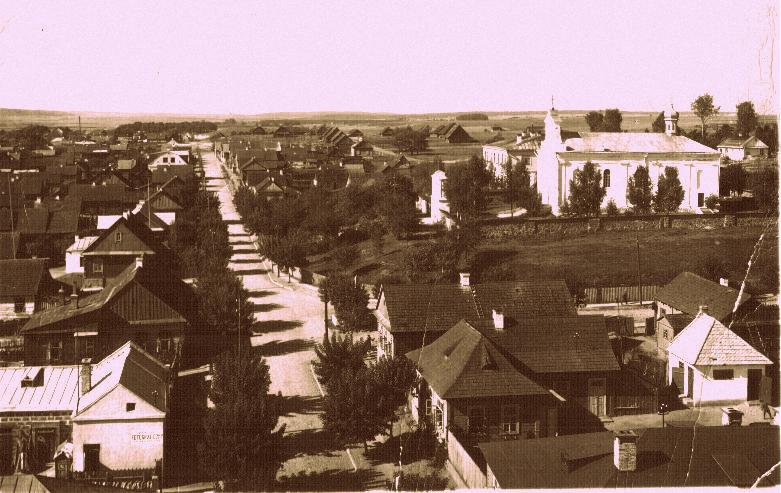
Panorama in the interwar period

=== World War II ===
Following the invasion of Poland at the start of World War II in 1939, the town was occupied by the Soviet Union until 1941, then by Nazi Germany until 1944. 25 soldiers of the local Border Protection Corps, 17 Polish policemen, a local teacher and a local school inspector were murdered by the Russians in the Katyn massacre in 1940.

In June 1941, there were more than 3,000 Jews living in the town, including several hundred refugees from the German occupied parts of Poland. The city was under German occupation from 1941 to 1944. After a week of occupation, the Germans shot around 200 Jews together with several dozen non-Jews, allegedly as a reprisal for sniper fire directed at German soldiers. On September 23, 1942, some 450 Jews were sent to their workplaces, and 750 Jews, most of them women, were shot in a forest, while another 850 either managed to flee or remained in hiding in the ghetto. On October 2, another 488 Jews, composed mostly of women and children were shot. Another 350 Jews were killed on October 11. On January 31, 1943, the remaining 254 Jews, including those brought in from Novy Sverzhen, were shot. In the following days, the captured Jews were also shot and 293 Jews had been shot by February 4, 1943. Some of the Jews who fled the ghetto survived by joining the Bielski partisans in the nearby Naliboki Forest. In 1944, the town was re-occupied by the Soviet Union, which annexed it from Poland in 1945.

== Climate ==
Climate data for Stowbtsy (1991–2020)
Month	Jan	Feb	Mar	Apr	May	Jun	Jul	Aug	Sep	Oct	Nov	Dec	Year
Record high °C (°F)	4.3 (39.7)	6.0 (42.8)	13.5 (56.3)	23.2 (73.8)	28.0 (82.4)	30.3 (86.5)	31.8 (89.2)	31.5 (88.7)	26.5 (79.7)	19.4 (66.9)	11.6 (52.9)	6.0 (42.8)	31.8 (89.2)
Mean daily maximum °C (°F)	−1.7 (28.9)	−0.4 (31.3)	5.0 (41.0)	13.3 (55.9)	19.4 (66.9)	22.9 (73.2)	24.9 (76.8)	24.2 (75.6)	18.0 (64.4)	10.8 (51.4)	4.0 (39.2)	−0.3 (31.5)	11.7 (53.1)
Daily mean °C (°F)	−4.1 (24.6)	−3.3 (26.1)	0.9 (33.6)	7.9 (46.2)	13.5 (56.3)	17.1 (62.8)	19.0 (66.2)	18.2 (64.8)	12.8 (55.0)	6.8 (44.2)	1.6 (34.9)	−2.5 (27.5)	7.3 (45.1)
Mean daily minimum °C (°F)	−6.4 (20.5)	−5.9 (21.4)	−2.5 (27.5)	3.0 (37.4)	7.9 (46.2)	11.6 (52.9)	13.7 (56.7)	12.7 (54.9)	8.4 (47.1)	3.6 (38.5)	−0.4 (31.3)	−4.6 (23.7)	3.4 (38.1)
Record low °C (°F)	−20.1 (−4.2)	−17.4 (0.7)	−11.2 (11.8)	−4.1 (24.6)	0.5 (32.9)	5.0 (41.0)	8.6 (47.5)	6.4 (43.5)	0.8 (33.4)	−4.1 (24.6)	−9.4 (15.1)	−15.4 (4.3)	−20.1 (−4.2)
Average precipitation mm (inches)	41.8 (1.65)	36.1 (1.42)	34.1 (1.34)	35.6 (1.40)	61.8 (2.43)	71.9 (2.83)	89.6 (3.53)	62.7 (2.47)	51.9 (2.04)	49.9 (1.96)	45.2 (1.78)	43.1 (1.70)	623.7 (24.56)
Average precipitation days (≥ 1.0 mm)	9.7	9.0	8.9	7.1	9.2	9.3	10.8	8.1	7.8	9.0	9.5	10.7	109.1
Source: NOAA

== Notable people ==
- Jakub Kolas (1882, Akinčycy village (now part of Stowbtsy) – 1956), Belarusian writer and poet
- Ivonka Survilla (born 1936), current President of the Rada of the Belarusian Democratic Republic

== In popular culture ==
In Tintin in the Land of the Soviets, Tintin arrived in the Soviet Union via Stowbtsy, where he was taken to a commissar. He later escaped an assassination attempt by an agent of the OGPU.

== Bibliography ==
- Верхняе Панямонне: альманах лакальнай гісторыі. Вып. 1. Minsk: І.П. Логвінаў. 2012. ISBN 978-985-6991-72-4..
