= Wilhelm Orlik-Rückemann =

Polish general (1894–1986)

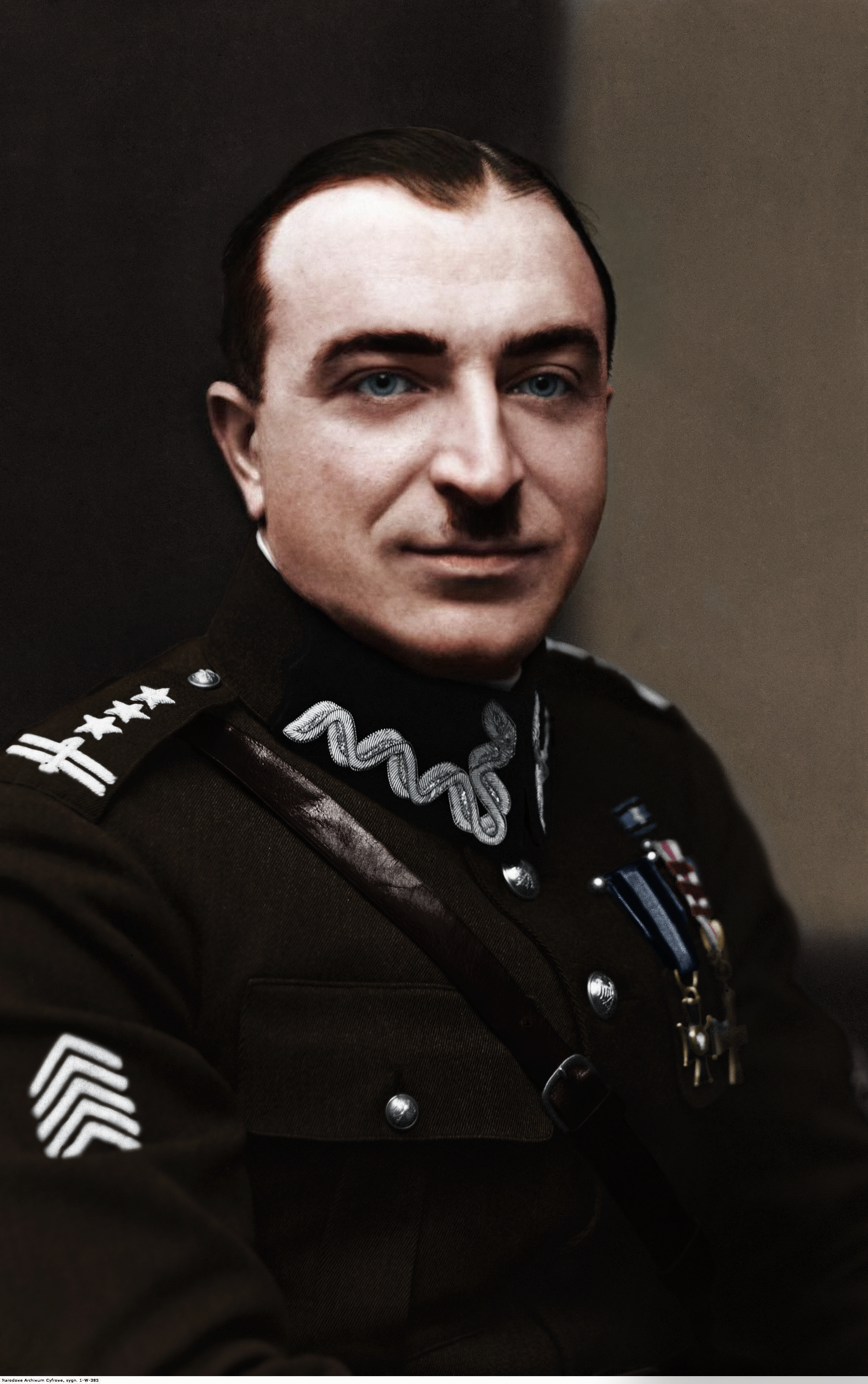
- Born: 1 August 1894; Lemberg, Austria-Hungary
- Died: 18 October 1986 (aged 92); Ottawa, Canada
- Military career
- Allegiance: Poland
- Branch: Wojsko Polskie
- Rank: generał brygady
- Commands: Border Defence Corps
- Conflicts: First World War; Polish–Ukrainian War; Polish–Bolshevik War; Second World War Battle of Szack Battle of Wytyczno
- Awards: Virtuti Militari 5th Class; Polonia Restituta 3rd Class; Cross of Independence; Cross of Valour, four times; Gold Cross of Merit

Wilhelm Orlik-Rückemann (1894–1986) was a Polish general, military commander and one of the pioneers of armoured warfare in Poland.

== Early life ==
Wilhelm Orlik-Rückemann was born on 1 August 1894 in Lemberg, Austria-Hungary (later Lwów, Poland, and today Lviv, Ukraine.) In 1912 he started studies at the Road and Bridge Engineering faculty of the Lwów University of Technology. His studies, however, were halted by the outbreak of World War I. In 1914 Orlik-Rückemann volunteered for the Polish Legions, where he served with distinction at various command posts in the 6th Infantry Regiment. After the oath crisis of 1917 he was drafted to the Austro-Hungarian Army, where he served with the 19th Rifle Regiment. In 1918 he also graduated from the Infantry Reserve Officer's School.

== Polish Army ==
On 4 November 1918, he joined the Polish Army. During the Polish-Ukrainian War of 1919 he was taken prisoner by the Ukrainians, but was later released after Piłsudski signed an alliance with Symon Petlura. Orlik-Rückemann was then sent to armoured forces school and was given the command of a small tank unit equipped entirely with French FT-17 tanks. During the Polish-Bolshevik War he became one of the most successful tank commanders of the Polish forces and during the Battle of Warsaw on 16 August 1920 he was promoted to colonel and given the command of the 1st Tank Regiment.

After the war Orlik-Rückemann remained in the Polish Army and until 1 May 1927 was the commanding officer of the 1st Tank Regiment. He also graduated from the faculty of tank combat commanders of the Ecole Superieure de Guerre in Paris. After liquidation of his unit, Orlik-Rückemann was transferred to the Ministry of War Affairs and then in January 1928 became the deputy commanding officer of the 23rd Infantry Division.

On 27 February 1932 Orlik-Rückemann became the commanding officer of the 9th Infantry Division and the following year was promoted to brigadier general. In December 1938 he became the deputy commander of the elite Border Defence Corps and on 8 August 1939 became its commander.

== World War II ==
Shortly before the start of World War II, Orlik-Rückemann's forces were deprived of most of the reserves that were transferred to western Poland to strengthen the Polish units stationed there. After the outbreak of the Polish Defensive War of 1939 and the Soviet Union's invasion of Poland on 17 September, Orlik-Rückemann's forces could offer only a token resistance against the overwhelming odds. To prevent the complete destruction of his forces, Orlik-Rückemann decided to withdraw them from the 300 kilometre long border in the area of Polesie and break through to Warsaw and the forces of Polesie Independent Operational Group under general Franciszek Kleeberg.

Until 22 September he gathered approximately 8,000 men and started his march towards Warsaw. Constant skirmishes with the Red Army and the Fifth column brought down the morale of his men. To counter the threat of a breakdown, Orlik-Rückemann decided to start a major battle with the Red Army. During the Battle of Szack, on 28 September, his men managed to rout the Soviet 52nd Rifle Division. On 30 September the unit crossed the Bug river and reached the village of Wytyczno, some 20 kilometres south-east of Włodawa. The Battle of Wytyczno started the following day, when his unit was attacked by the Soviet 45th Rifle Division, reinforced with tanks and artillery. After 15 hours of heavy fighting, the supplies of the Polish forces were almost depleted and Orlik-Rückemann decided to divide his unit into small groups and order them to break through to the area occupied by the Independent Operational Group Polesie on their own. Most of the Polish forces reached their destination unopposed and with negligible losses.

After the end of hostilities in Poland, Orlik-Rückemann managed to evade being captured and crossed the Lithuanian border. From there he managed to get to Sweden and by the end of October he was in the United Kingdom. There he served in the Polish Army in exile on various staff posts.

== After World War II ==
Between 1945 and 1947 he was working for the Polish Resettlement Corps. He was deprived of Polish citizenship by the communist authorities of Poland and remained in exile. Initially he lived in London and in 1972 he moved to his family to Ottawa, Canada. Wilhelm Orlik-Rückemann died on October 18, 1986, in Ottawa.

== Promotions ==
- Podporucznik Legionów Polskich (Second lieutenant of the Polish Legions) - 9 August 1915
- Porucznik Legionów Polskich (First lieutenant of the Polish Legions) - 11 October 1915
- Kapitan (Captain) - 1919
- Podpułkownik (Lieutenant colonel) - 3 May 1922
- Pułkownik (Colonel) - 1 December 1924
- Generał brygady (Brigadier general) - 21 December 1932

== Decorations ==
- Silver Cross of the Virtuti Militari (1921)
- Commander's Cross of the Order of Polonia Restituta
- Cross of Independence (6 June 1931)
- Cross of Valour (four times)
- Gold Cross of Merit with Swords
- Gold Cross of Merit (10 November 1928)
- Commemorative Medal for the War of 1918–1921
- Medal of the 10th Anniversary of Regained Independence
- Bronze Medal for Long Service
- Wound Decoration
- Officer of the Legion of Honour (France)
- Medal of the 10th Anniversary of the War of Independence (Latvija)
