= Stowbtsy district =

District of Minsk region, Belarus

Stowbtsy district Стаўбцоўскі раён (Belarusian) Столбцовский район (Russian)
- District
- Flag Coat of arms

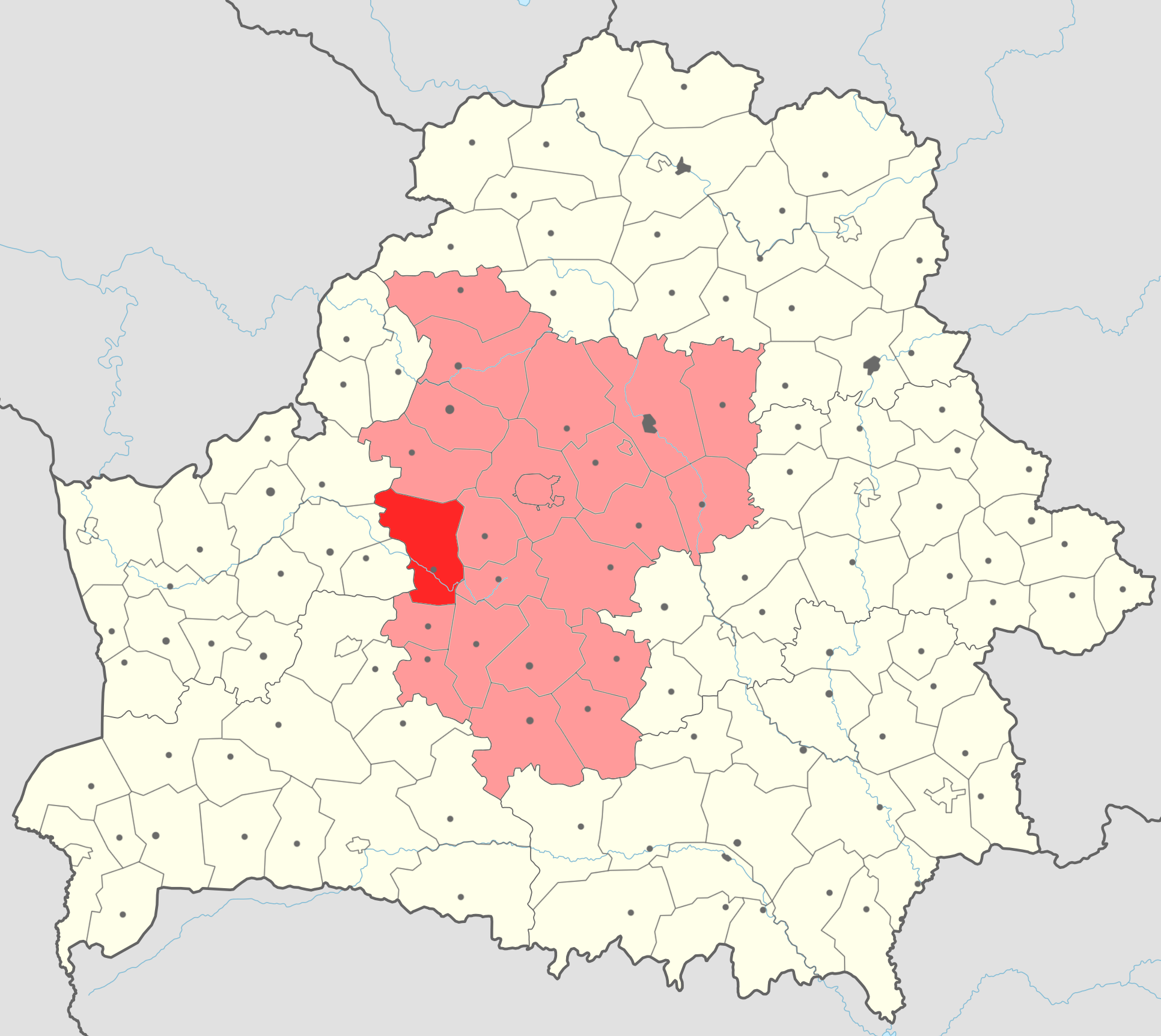
- Coordinates: 53°29′N 26°44′E
- Country: Belarus
- Region: Minsk region
- Administrative center: Stowbtsy

Area
  - District: 1,884 km^{2} (727 sq mi)

Population (2024)
  - District: 37,546
  - Density: 19.93/km^{2} (51.62/sq mi)
  - Urban: 17,737
  - Rural: 19,809
- Time zone: UTC+3 (MSK)

Stowbtsy district or Stoŭbcy district (Belarusian: Стаўбцоўскі раён; Russian: Столбцовский район) is a district (raion) of Minsk region in Belarus. Its administrative center is Stowbtsy. As of 2024, it has a population of 37,546.

== Notable residents ==
- Jazep Losik (1884, Mikalajeŭščyna village - 1940), Belarusian academic, leading figure of the independence movement and a victim of Stalin’s purges
