= Soviet occupation of Latvia in 1940 =

First military takeover of Latvia by the Soviet Union

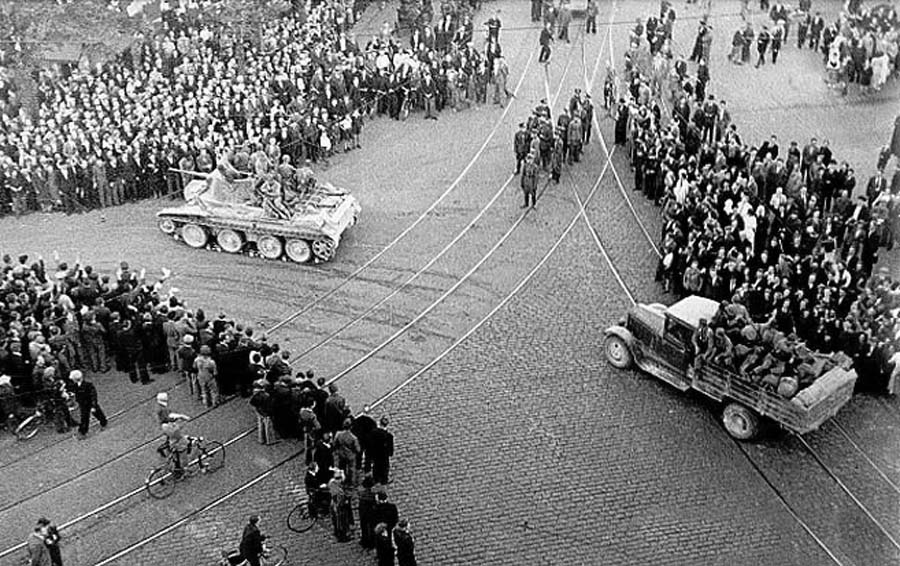
Red Army BT-7 tank and ZIS-5 truck in Riga (1940)

The Soviet occupation of Latvia in 1940 refers to the military occupation of the Republic of Latvia by the Soviet Union under the provisions of the 1939 Molotov–Ribbentrop Pact with Nazi Germany and its Secret Additional Protocol signed in August 1939.

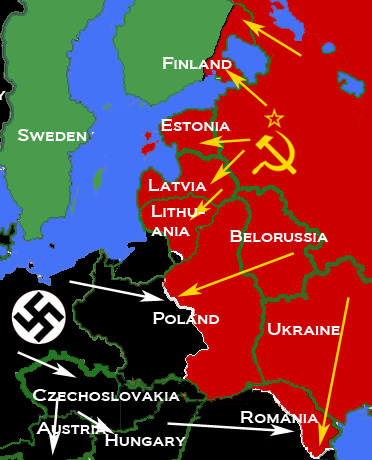
Territories occupied by the USSR and Nazi Germany at the beginning of World War II (1939–1940)

In 1989, the USSR condemned the 1939 secret protocol between Nazi Germany and itself that had led to the invasion and occupation of the three Baltic countries, including Latvia. In July 1989, the people of Latvia began the process of restoring their independence. In 1991, after the dissolution of the Soviet Union, Latvia's sovereignty was fully restored. On 22 August 1996, the Latvian parliament adopted a declaration that stated that the Soviet occupation of Latvia in 1940 was a military occupation and an illegal incorporation.

The occupation was condemned by the European Court of Human Rights, the Government of Latvia, the United States Department of State, and the European Union.

== Background ==
=== 1918–1939: historical background ===
In the aftermath of the October Revolution of 1917, Latvia declared its independence on 18 November 1918. After a prolonged War of Independence against Soviet Russia (the predecessor of the Soviet Union), the two countries signed a peace treaty on 11 August 1920. In its Article 2 Soviet Russia "unreservedly recognises the independence and sovereignty of the Latvian State and voluntarily and forever renounces all sovereign rights (...) to the Latvian people and territory." The independence of Latvia was diplomatically recognised by the Allied Supreme Council (France, Great Britain, Italy, Japan, Belgium) on 26 January 1921. Other states followed the suit. On 22 September 1921, Latvia was admitted to membership in the League of Nations and remained a member until the formal dissolution of the League in 1946. On 5 February 1932, a non-aggression treaty with the Soviet Union was signed. The treaty was based on the 11 August 1920 treaty, whose basic agreements inalterably and for all time form the firm basis of the relationship of the two states.

=== Relevant treaties between USSR and Latvia ===
Before World War II, the Republic of Latvia and USSR had both signed and ratified following treaties:

Kellogg–Briand Pact
27 August 1928 Kellogg–Briand Pact renouncing war as an instrument of national policy
Non-aggression treaty
Latvia, USSR on 5 February 1932
The Convention for the Definition of Aggression
On 3 July 1933 for the first time in the history of international relations, aggression was defined in a binding treaty signed at the Soviet Embassy in London by USSR and among others, Latvia.
Article II defines forms of aggression. There shall be recognized as an aggressor that State which shall be the first to have committed one of the following actions:
Relevant chapters:
- Second: invasion by armed forces of the territory of another State even without a declaration of war.
- Fourth: a naval blockade of coasts or ports of another State.

== 1939–1940: the road to loss of independence ==
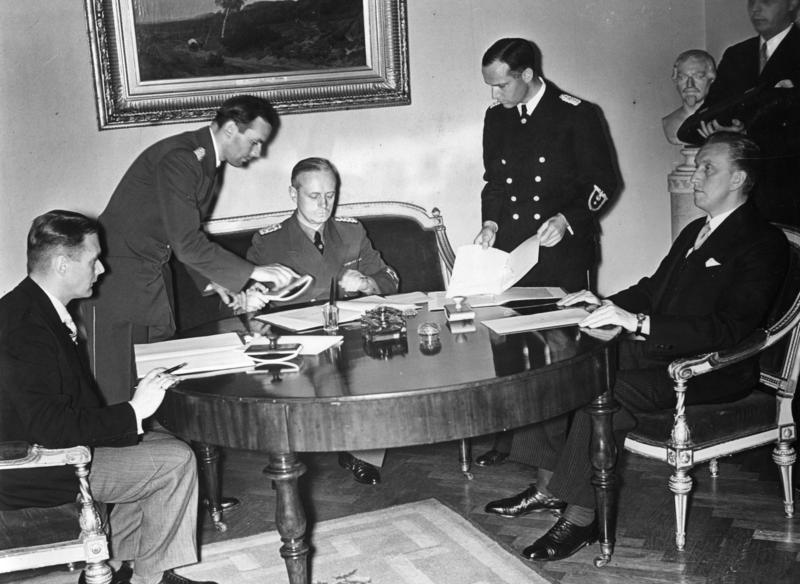
Signing of German–Estonian and German-Latvian nonaggression pacts. Sitting from the left: Vilhelms Munters, Latvian MFA; Joachim von Ribbentrop, German MFA; and Karl Selter, Estonian MFA.

=== German–Latvian non-aggression pact ===
The German–Latvian non-aggression pact was signed in Berlin on 7 June 1939. In light of the German advance in the east, the Soviet government demanded an Anglo–French guarantee of the independence of the Baltic states, during their negotiations for an alliance with the Western Powers. The Latvian and Estonian governments, ever suspicious of Soviet intentions, decided to accept a mutual non-aggression pact with Germany. The German–Estonian and German–Latvian Non-aggression pacts were signed in Berlin on 7 June 1939 by Latvian foreign minister Vilhelms Munters and Joachim von Ribbentrop. On the next day Adolf Hitler received the Estonian and Latvian envoys, and in course of these interviews stressed maintaining and strengthening commercial links between Germany and Baltic states. Ratifications of the German-Latvian pact were exchanged in Berlin on 24 July 1939 and it became effective on the same day. It was registered in League of Nations Treaty Series on 24 August 1939.

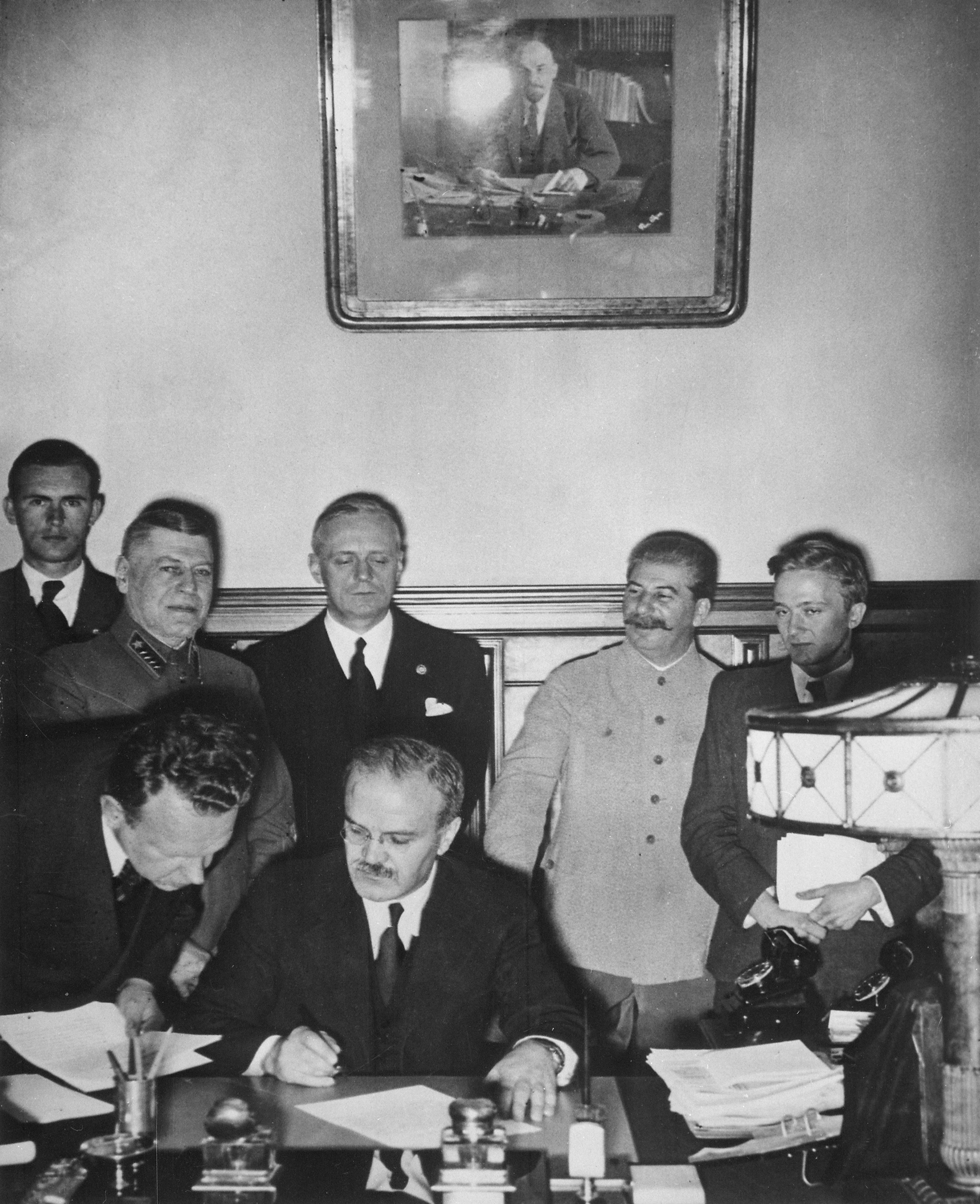
Molotov signing the German-Soviet Nonaggression Pact

=== German–Soviet non-aggression pact ===
The Molotov–Ribbentrop Pact, signed 23 August 1939 contained secret protocols to split up territories between Germany and the Soviet Union. According to these protocols, Finland, Estonia, Latvia and Bessarabia were within the Soviet sphere of interest, and Poland and Lithuania fell into the German sphere of interest. The Soviet Union did not officially admit the existence of these protocols until, under pressure from the Baltic SSRs, on 24 December 1989, the Congress of the USSR People's Deputies officially recognized the secret deals and condemned them as illegal and invalid from their inception.

=== Invasion of Poland ===
Nazi Germany invaded Poland on 1 September 1939. France and Britain, which were obligated by treaty to protect Poland, responded with notes of protest requesting the Germans withdraw. Following French-British indecision, Britain acted alone moving forward with a two-hour ultimatum at 9:00 a.m. on 3 September, which France was then forced to follow, issuing its own ultimatum. Nevertheless, despite declarations that a state of war now existed with Germany, the inter-Allied military conferences of 4-6 September determined there was no possibility of supporting an eastern front in Poland. France subsequently requested Britain not bomb Germany, fearing military retaliation against the French populace. It was determined to do nothing, so as to not provoke a transfer of German forces to the western front. Chamberlain declared on 12 September "There is no hurry as time is on our side". The abandonment of Poland was complete.

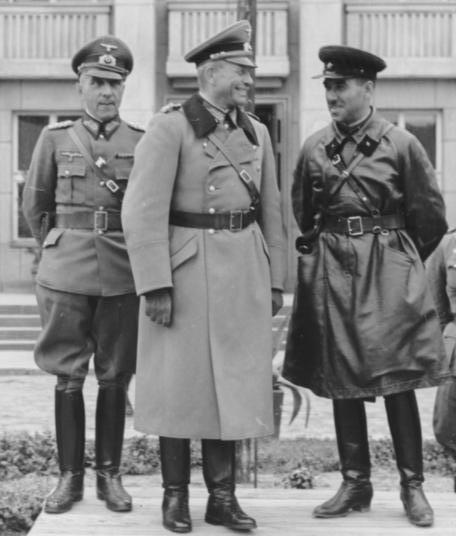
A joint parade of Wehrmacht and Red Army in Brest at the end of the invasion of Poland. On the tribune are Major General Heinz Guderian (centre) and Brigadier Semyon Krivoshein (right).

Stalin then moved forward with his part of the Pact, ordering the Red Army on 17 September to cross the Soviet-Polish frontier under the claimed necessity to protect the Belarusians and Ukrainians in the territory of Poland, which Soviets argued "ceased to exist" in the wake of German successes. Stalin then suggested a "trade" to Hitler to solve the "Baltic problem". On 28 September 1939, Germany and the Soviet Union having partitioned Poland signed a border agreement, including a second secret protocol, handing Lithuania to Stalin in exchange for two Polish provinces. Shortly thereafter, on 3 October 1939, the German ambassador to the Soviet Union, Friedrich Werner von der Schulenburg, had also suggested to Molotov that various changes in the borders of the Lithuanian territory wait until the "Soviet Union incorporates Lithuania, an idea on which, I believe, the arrangement concerning Lithuania was originally based". Subsequently, the Soviet Union further agreed to compensate Nazi Germany 7,500,000 gold dollars (or 31,500,000 Reichsmarks) for the Reich renouncing its "claims" on the Lithuanian territory it was to originally possess based on the September 28th agreement.

The Soviet Union now occupied just over half of all Polish territory, and the Allied powers had demonstrated themselves incapable of military intervention on the Eastern front. There were no impediments remaining to Stalin, in concert with Hitler, achieving his aims in the Baltics.

=== Baltic–Soviet relations in autumn 1939 ===
On 24 September 1939, warships of the Red Navy appeared off Latvia's northern neighbour, Estonian ports, Soviet bombers began a threatening patrol over Tallinn and the nearby countryside. USSR then violated the air space of all three Baltic states, flying massive intelligence gathering operations on 25 September. Moscow demanded that Baltic countries allow the USSR to establish military bases and station troops on their soil for the duration of the European war.

During talks in Moscow, on 2 October 1939, Stalin told Vilhelms Munters, the Latvian foreign minister: "I tell you frankly, a division of spheres of interest has already taken place. As far as Germany is concerned we could occupy you." The Baltics took this threat seriously.

The government of Estonia accepted the ultimatum signing the corresponding agreement on 28 September 1939; Latvia following on 5 October 1939; and Lithuania shortly thereafter, on 10 October 1939. In Latvia's case it was signed by Latvian Minister of Foreign Affairs Vilhelms Munters and Soviet Commissar of Foreign Affairs Vyacheslav Molotov. Ratifications were exchanged in Riga on 11 October 1939, and the treaty became effective on the same day. It was registered in League of Nations Treaty Series on 6 November 1939. Articles of the treaty were:

- Article 1 provided for military cooperation between the parties in case of an attack by a third party.
- Article 2 obliged the Soviet government to assist the Latvian government in providing armaments.
- Article 3 permitted the Soviet government to establish military and naval bases on Latvian territory.
- Article 4 obliged the Soviet and Latvian governments not to engage in military alliances against the other party.
- Article 5 stipulated that the political and economic systems and the sovereignty of both parties shall not be affected by the treaty.
- Article 6 dealt with ratification, and stipulated that the treaty shall remain in force for ten years, with an option to extend it for further ten years.

As Latvian National Foundation says the agreement called for Latvia to:

- lend bases to the Soviet Union at Liepāja, Ventspils, and Pitrags until 1949;
- build special airfields for Soviet requirements; and
- grant the stationing of Soviet military garrisons totalling 30,000 troops.

At face value, this pact did not impinge upon Latvian sovereignty. Section 5 of the Pact reads as follows: "The carrying into effect of the present pact must in no way affect the sovereign rights of the contracting parties, in particular their political structure, their economic and social system, and their military measures. The areas set aside for the bases and airfields remain the territory of the Latvian Republic."

With Baltic Sovietization imminent, Hitler issued a "call home" to ethnic Germans. Latvia entered into agreement with Nazi Germany on the repatriation of citizens of German nationality on 30 October 1939. In spring 1940, 51,000 left Latvia for resettlement in Poland. A second call a year later brought out another 10,500.

Publicly, on 31 October 1939, the Soviet Supreme Council called fears of Baltic Sovietization "all nonsense". Privately, this stationing of Soviet troops in Latvia under the terms of the mutual assistance pact marked the beginning of the fruition of long-standing Soviet desires to gain control of the Baltics.

=== Soviet invasion of Finland ===
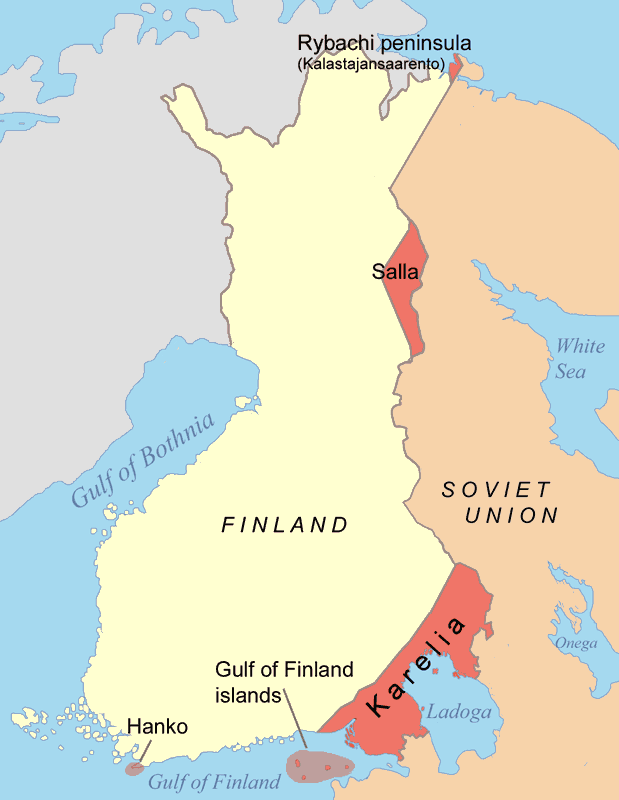
Winter War: Finland's concessions

Similar demands were forwarded to Finland. The Soviets demanded that Finland cede or lease parts of its territory, as well as the destruction of Finnish defenses along the Karelian Isthmus. After the Finns rejected these demands, the Soviets responded with military force. The USSR launched the Winter War on 30 November 1939, with the goal of annexing Finland. Simultaneously, a puppet regime, called the Finnish Democratic Republic, was created by the Soviets to govern Finland after Soviet conquest. Because the Soviet attack was judged as illegal, the Soviet Union was expelled from the League of Nations on 14 December.

The initial period of the war proved disastrous for the Soviet military, taking severe losses while making little headway. On 29 January 1940, the Soviets put an end to their Finnish Democratic Republic puppet government and recognized the government in Helsinki as the legal government of Finland, informing it that they were willing to negotiate peace. The Soviets reorganized their forces and launched a new offensive along the Karelian Isthmus in February 1940. As fighting in Viipuri raged and the hope of foreign intervention faded, the Finns accepted peace terms on 12 March 1940 with the signing of the Moscow Peace Treaty. Fighting ended the following day. The Finns had retained their independence, but ceded 9% of Finnish territory to the Soviet Union. In June 1941, hostilities between Finland and USSR resumed in the Continuation War.

== 1940–1941: the first Soviet occupation ==
=== Political background ===
Apparent escape from Finland's fate may have led to a false sense of security for Latvia. Four months before the arrival of Soviet troops in Latvia, Vilhelms Munters, addressing an audience at the University of Latvia on 12 February 1940, stated, "We have every reason to describe the relations existing between Latvia and the Soviet Union as very satisfactory. There are people who will say that these favourable conditions are of a temporary nature only, and that sooner or later we shall have to reckon with internal-political and foreign-political pressure on the part of the Soviet Union. The foundation on which they base these prophesies is a secret of the prophets themselves. The experience of our Government certainly does not justify such forebodings."

With Soviet failure in Finland sealed for the moment, it was little more than a month after Munters' positive expressions that Molotov, speaking on 25 March 1940, essentially announced Soviet intentions to annex the Baltic States, stating, "... the execution of the pacts progressed satisfactorily and created conditions favourable for a further improvement of the relations between Soviet Russia and these States". Improvement of the relations being a euphemism for Soviet takeover.

In March and April 1940, immediately after Molotov's speech, the Soviet press commenced attacks on the Latvian government. Next, the NKVD orchestrated a series of strikes in Riga and Liepāja. When those failed to develop into a general strike, the Soviets blamed that failure on the "irresponsible element which spoils the good neighbourly relations".

Fearing Soviet action, on 17 May 1940, the Latvian government secretly issued emergency powers to the Latvian minister in London, Kārlis Reinholds Zariņš, designating Alfreds Bilmanis, the Latvian minister in Washington, as his substitute.

=== Soviet invasion ===
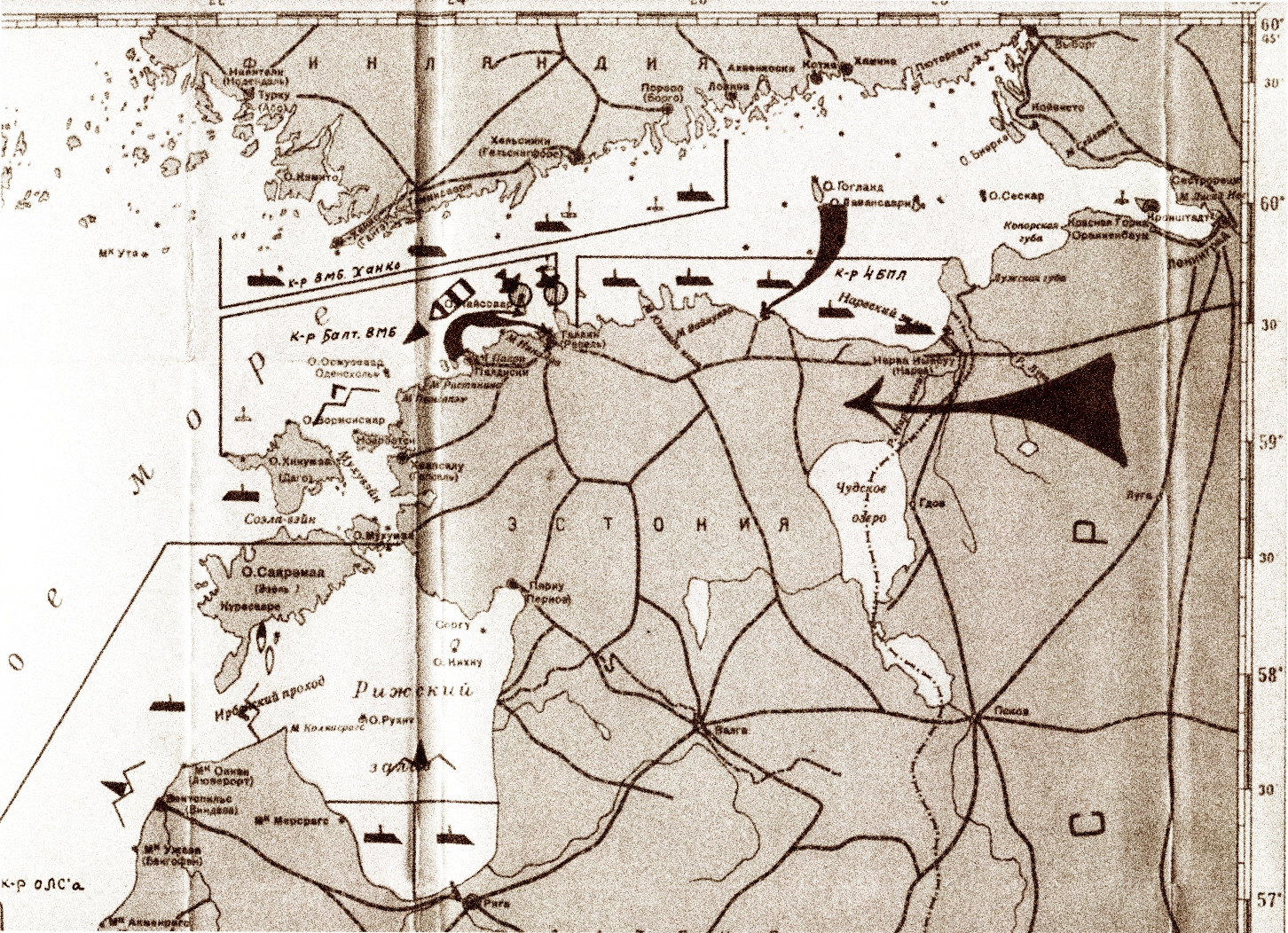
Schematics of the Soviet naval military blockade of Estonia and Latvia in 1940 (Russian State Naval Archives)

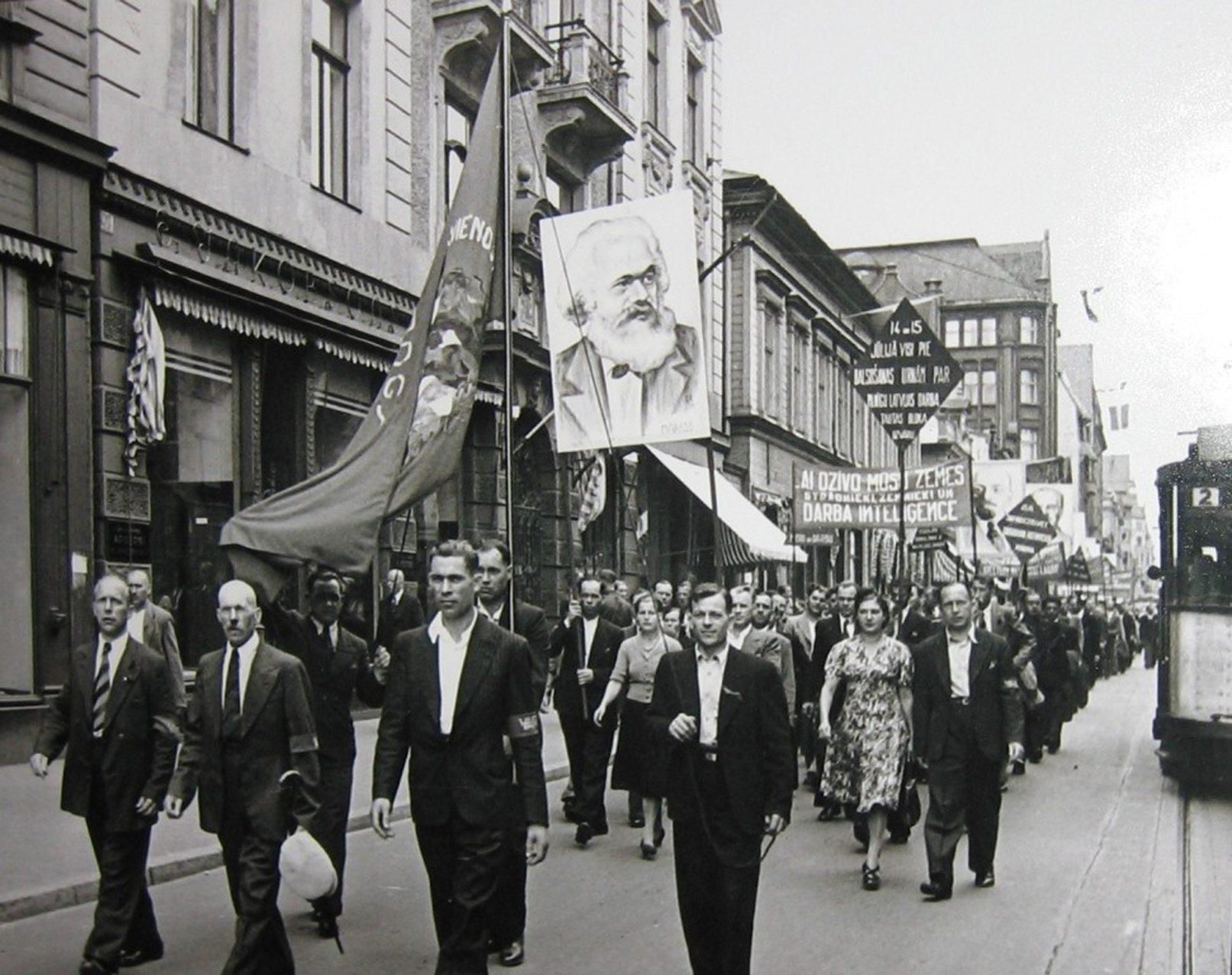
Soviet-organized rally in Riga, 1940

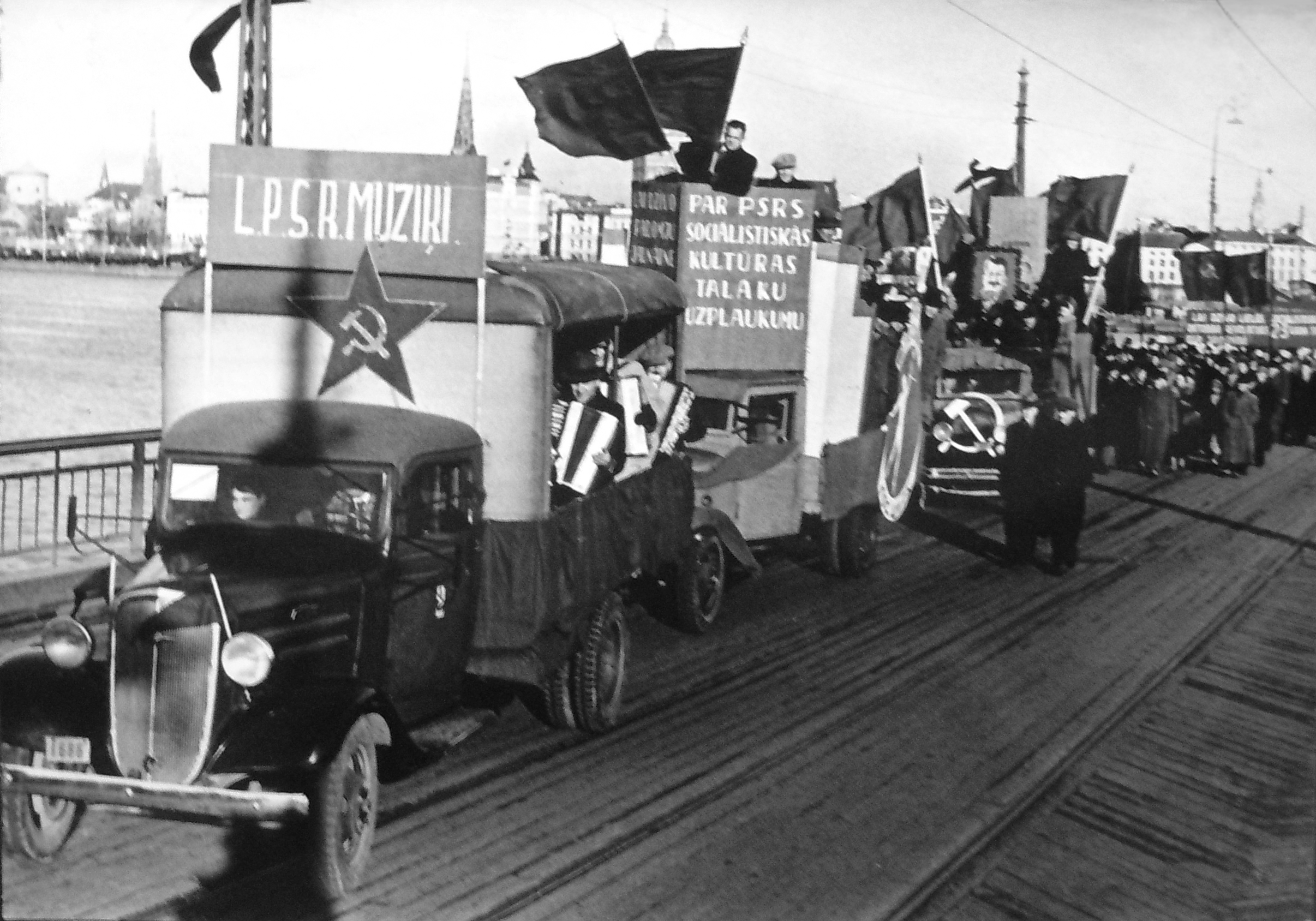
Parade in Riga. 7 November 1940.

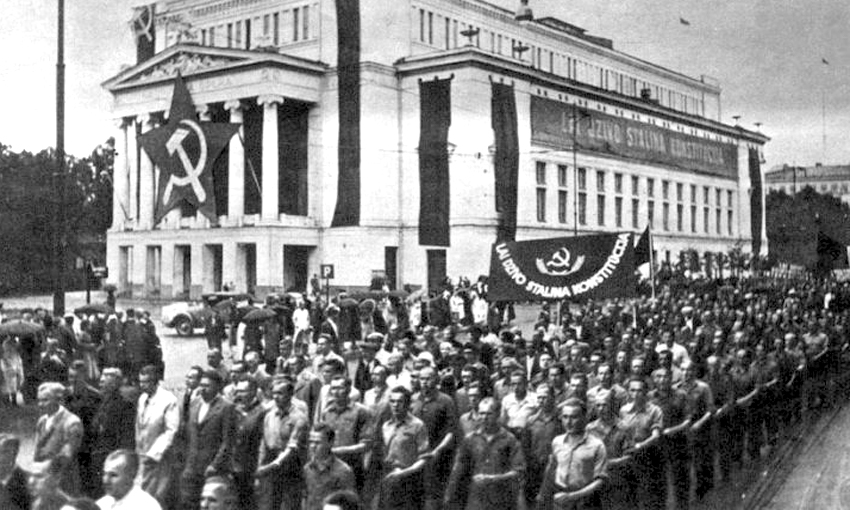
Soviet-organized first May Day rally in Riga, 1941

On 28 May 1940, the Lithuanian Minister in Moscow received a note from Molotov which dealt with the alleged kidnapping of two Soviet soldiers in Vilna. The Lithuanian government sought to clear up this matter by a Soviet-Lithuanian commission under the terms of the mutual assistance pact. Moscow rejected this proposal and cut off further discussion, soon showing and rapidly playing their hand:

- On 12 June 1940, the order for a total military blockade on Estonia to the Soviet Baltic Fleet is given: according to the director of the Russian State Archive of the Naval Department Pavel Petrov (C. Phil.) referring to the records in the archive
- 14 June 1940: while world attention is focused on the fall of Paris to Nazi Germany a day earlier, Molotov accuses the Baltic countries of conspiracy against the Soviet Union and delivers an ultimatum to Lithuania for the establishment of a government the Soviets approve of. On the same day, the Soviet blockade of Estonia went into effect. According to eyewitness accounts pieced together by Estonian and Finnish investigators, two Soviet bombers downed Finnish passenger airplane Kaleva flying from Tallinn to Helsinki carrying three diplomatic pouches from the U.S. legations in Tallinn, Riga and Helsinki. The US Foreign Service employee Henry W. Antheil Jr. was killed in the crash.
- 15 June 1940: Soviet troops invade Lithuania and position troops to invade Latvia.
- 15 June 1940: Soviet troops attack the Latvian border guards at Masļenki, killing three border guards and two civilians, as well as taking 10 border guards and 27 civilians as hostages to the Soviet Union.
- 16 June 1940: the Soviet Union invades Latvia and Estonia. Soviets delivered ultimatums to Estonia and Latvia, to be answered within 6 hours, demanding: (1) the establishment of pro-Soviet Governments which, under the protection of the Red Army, would be better capable of carrying out the Pacts of Mutual Assistance; (2) the free passage of Soviet troops into Estonia and Latvia in order to place them in the most important centers and to avoid possible provocative acts against Soviet garrisons. Unable to resist on their own, with no external assistance available, under threat of the bombing of cities and heavily outnumbered, Latvia and Estonia capitulated.
- 17 June 1940: Soviet troops invade Latvia and occupied bridges, post/telephone, telegraph, and broadcasting offices.
- 17 June 1940: Andrey Vyshinsky, Deputy Chairman of the Council of People's Commissars of the Soviet Union (and prosecutor of Joseph Stalin's show trials in 1937–1938), introduces himself to President Kārlis Ulmanis as Soviet special envoy.

=== Loss of independence ===
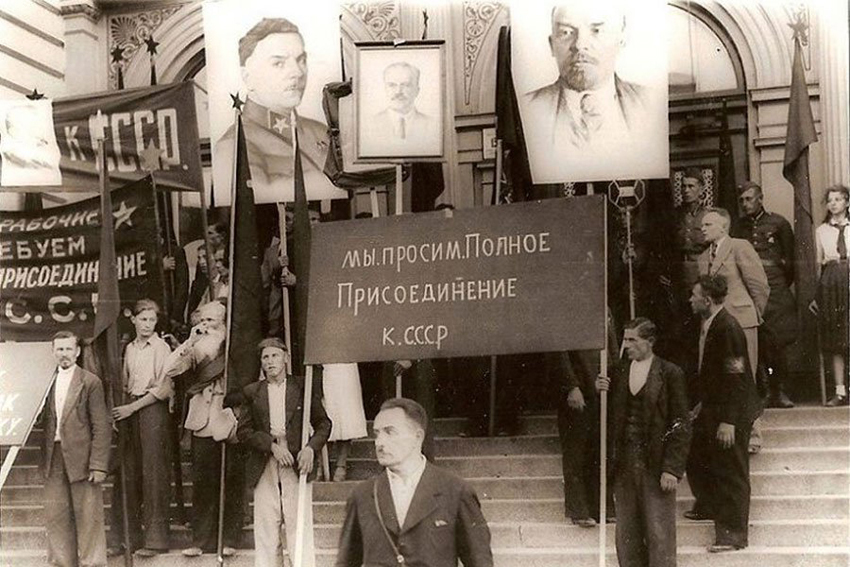
Soviet propaganda demonstration in Liepāja, 1940. Posters in Russian say: We demand the full accession to the USSR!.

Soviet orchestration of events continued following the invasion, complete with protestors, who had arrived with the Red Army troops, organizing mass marches and meetings in order to create the impression of popular unrest:

- 19 June 1940: Vishinski visits Ulmanis again, this time, to deliver the list, pre-approved by Moscow, of the new members of the cabinet of the Latvian government.
- 20 June 1940: Ulmanis forced to approve pro-Soviet government which takes office. Jailed members of the formerly illegal communist party released. Public "processions of thanksgiving" organized in honour of Stalin.
- 30 June 1940: the Lithuanian Foreign Minister, Vincas Kreve-Mickevicius, meets with Molotov. Molotov is blunt in communicating the Soviet intent to occupy the entire region: "You must take a good look at reality and understand that in the future small nations will have to disappear. Your Lithuania along with the other Baltic nations, including Finland, will have to join the glorious family of the Soviet Union. Therefore you should begin now to initiate your people into the Soviet system, which in the future shall reign everywhere, throughout all Europe; put into practice earlier in some places, as in the Baltic nations, later in others."
- 5 July 1940: decree issued announcing new elections; the Latvian democratic parties organize under the National Committee and attempt to participate.
- 9 July 1940: Vilis Lācis, the Soviet-appointed Minister of Internal Affairs, orders the National Committee shut down, its most prominent members deported. Deportations are already taking place from territory not (yet) part of the Soviet Union.
- 14-15 July 1940: rigged elections held in Latvia (and the other Baltic states). Only one pre-approved list of candidates was allowed for elections for the "People's Parliament". The ballots held following instructions: "Only the list of the Latvian Working People's Bloc must be deposited in the ballot box. The ballot must be deposited without any changes." The alleged voter activity index was 97.6%. Most notably, the complete election results were published in Moscow 12 hours before the election closed. Soviet electoral documents found later substantiated that the results were completely fabricated. Tribunals were set up to punish "traitors to the people". those who had fallen short of the "political duty" of voting Latvia into the USSR. Those who failed to have their passports stamped for so voting were allowed to be shot in the back of the head.
- 21 July 1940: the fraudulently installed Saeima meets for the first time. It has only one piece of business—a petition to join the Soviet Union (the consideration of such an action was denied throughout the election). The petition carried unanimously. However, it was illegal under the Latvian Constitution, still in effect, which required a plebiscite referendum for approving such an action: two-thirds of all eligible participating and a plain majority approving. Ulmanis is forced to resign.
- 22 July 1940: Ulmanis deported to the Soviet Union, dying in captivity in 1942. Land is nationalized (see also below).
- 23 July 1940: the US Undersecretary of State Sumner Welles condemns the "devious processes" by which "the political independence and territorial integrity of the three small Baltic republics were to be deliberately annihilated by one of their more powerful neighbours".
- 31 July 1940: Minister of Defense Jānis Balodis and family deported to Soviet Union (order hand-written by Vilis Lācis).
- 5 August 1940: the Soviet Union grants the petitions of Lithuania, Latvia, and Estonia, respectively, to join. Latvia was incorporated as the 15th Republic of the Soviet Union. Aside from Germany, no Western nation recognizes the annexation as legitimate de jure.

Accurate numbers for the losses the Soviets inflicted on Latvia are not available. They have been estimated at 35,000 dead from military action, executions, or deportation. Many more found refuge abroad. These losses all began during the first Soviet occupation. This has also been referred to, in Latvian, as "Baigais Gads" (Year of Terror) (this term was also used in anti-Soviet propaganda of the period—these two uses should not be confused or allied in purpose. Baigais Gads is also a title of an openly antisemitic account of the events of the year penned by Pauls Kovalevskis, a Nazi sympathiser, in 1942). Further mass deportations and killing were planned, however the German invasion of Soviet territory brought a halt to this. A Lithuanian government official claims to have seen a document envisaging the removal of 700,000 from Lithuania.

=== Soviet terror ===
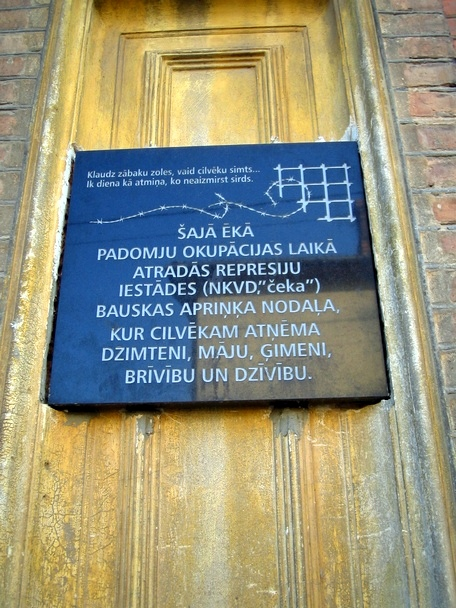
Plaque commemorating the Victims of Soviet NKVD in Bauska, Latvia

The Soviet authorities, having gained control over Latvia, immediately imposed a regime of terror. Hundreds of men were arrested, including many leaders of the Republic of Latvia. Tribunals were set up to punish "traitors to the people".

Under arrest and liable to prompt liquidation were Latvia's President Kārlis Ulmanis and Foreign Minister Vilhelms Munters. Immediate confiscation of property and execution within 24 hours was decreed for diplomats abroad who refused to recognize the new regimes and return to Latvia. Later orders expanded the list of repressions, including anyone related to someone in hiding from the government or who had fled abroad—which act made them a traitor to the state.

On 22 June 1940, all three Baltic parliaments passed initial resolutions on the nationalization of land, followed in Latvia by a Bill of Land Reform a week later. Initially, a maximum of 30 hectares of land could be used by a family, reduced during the second Soviet occupation to 15–20 hectares.

The June deportation took place on 13-14 June 1941, estimated at 15,600 men, women, and children, and including 20% of Latvia's last legal government. Approximately 35,000 total (1.8% of Latvia's population) were deported during the first Soviet occupation. Stalin's deportations also included thousands of Latvian Jews (the mass deportation totalled 131,500 across the Baltics).

According to the Serov Instructions, the deportations were swift and efficient and came in the middle of the night. Deportees were given an hour or less to get ready to leave. They were allowed to take with them their belongings not exceeding 100 kg in weight (money, food for a month, cooking appliances, clothing). The families would then be taken to the railway station. That was when they discovered that the men were to be separated from the women and children: "In view of the fact that a large number of deportees must be arrested and distributed in special camps and that their families must proceed to special settlements in distant regions, it is essential that the operation of removal of both the members of the deportee's family and its head shall be carried out simultaneously, without notifying them of the separation confronting them ... The convoy of the entire family to the station shall be effected in one vehicle and only at the station of departure shall the head of the family be placed separately from his family in a car specially intended for heads of families".

The trains were escorted by a NKVD officer and military convoy. Packed into barred cattle cars, with holes in the floor for sanitation, the deportees were taken to Siberia. Many died before even reaching their final destination because of harsh conditions. Many more perished during their first winter.

A number of Latvians who managed to avoid deportations decided to hide in the forests, where anti-Soviet units were organized. When Nazi Germany attacked Soviet Union, those rebels immediately went into collaboration with Nazi Germany.

== Aftermath ==
=== Occupation of Latvia by Nazi Germany 1941–1944 ===
Residents of Riga welcome the arrival of Nazi troops.

The Soviet-German war cut short this first year of Soviet occupation. The Nazi offensive, launched 22 June 1941, just over a week after the mass deportations were executed, entered Riga on 1 July 1941. This disrupted documented NKVD plans to deport several hundred thousand more from the Baltic states on 27-28 July 1941.

With memories of the mass deportations of a week before still fresh, the German troops were widely greeted at their arrival by the Latvians as liberators. The Latvian national anthem played on the radio, and, as Chris Bellamy wrote: "the [anti-Soviet] rebellion broke out immediately after the news of Barbarossa". The majority of ethnic Latvians who had been forced to serve in the Red Army deserted from their units, and soon afterwards attacked the NKVD. On 2 July 1941, a unit of Latvian deserters captured the town of Sigulda, and three days later, Latvian rebels took control over another town, Smiltene, also blocking the strategic road to Pskov. Latvians did not only desert en masse from regular Red Army units, they also escaped from military training camps, which were part of the Soviet mobilization plan. Among other battles with retreating Soviet units, Bellamy mentions Limbaži (4 July), Olaine (5 July), and Alūksne (9 July). All these locations were captured by Latvian rebels before the first Wehrmacht units appeared in the area.

Nazi Germany, however, had no plan or desire to restore autonomy to Latvia, even though they ordered Colonel Alexander Plesners to oversee formation of the Latvian Defence Forces. On 8 July the Germans announced that wearing of non-German uniforms was banned. Also, rebel units were ordered to disarm. Jewish fears of the Nazis—which had led some to look upon the Soviet occupation as a measure of security—were to prove tragically well founded.

By 10 July 1941, German armed forces had occupied all of Latvia's territory. Latvia became a part of Nazi Germany's Reichskommissariat Ostland – the Province General of Latvia (Generalbezirk Lettland). Anyone who was disobedient to the German occupation regime as well as those who had co-operated with the Soviet regime were killed or sent to concentration camps.

In 1939 Generalplan Ost was drawn up by Nazi Germany covering eastern countries. As regards Latvia, it was determined that the population of around 2,000,000 should be reduced by 50%, those remaining being considered worthy of "Germanisation". Accordingly, Jews, Romani people, communists, army officers, politicians, and other intellectuals all found themselves being rounded up. Further reductions in the civilian population would be achieved through the creation of food shortages, resulting in mass starvation.

=== Second Soviet occupation 1944–1991 ===
The Riga Offensive was part of the larger Baltic Offensive on the Eastern Front during World War II. It took place late in 1944, and drove German forces from the city of Riga.

Latvia was again occupied by the Soviet Union from 1944 to 1991. Under the Soviet occupation thousands of Latvians were deported to Siberian camps, executed or forced into exile.

Many Latvians fled in fishermen's boats and ships to Sweden and Germany, from where until 1951 they drifted to various parts of the Western world (mostly Australia and North America). Approximately 150,000 Latvians ended up in exile in the West.

According to approximate estimates, as a result of World War II the population of Latvia decreased by half a million (25% less than in 1939). In comparison with 1939 the Latvian population had diminished by about 300,000. The war also inflicted heavy losses on the economy – many historic cities were destroyed, as well as industry and the infrastructure.

In July 1989, following the dramatic events in East Germany, the Latvian Supreme Soviet adopted a "Declaration of Sovereignty" and amended the Constitution to assert the supremacy of its laws over those of the USSR.

On 23 August 1989 political demonstration Baltic Way took place. Approximately two million people joined their hands to form an over 600 kilometre long human chain across the three Baltic states (Estonia, Latvia, Lithuania).This demonstration was organized to draw the world's attention to the common historical fate which these three countries suffered.

In March 1990 candidates from the pro-independence party Latvian Popular Front gained a two-thirds majority in the Supreme Council in democratic elections.

On 4 May 1990, the Latvian Council declared its intention to restore full Latvian independence. Soviet political and military forces tried unsuccessfully to overthrow the Latvian government. On 21 August 1991, Latvia claimed de facto independence. International recognition, including that of the USSR, followed. The United States, which had never recognized Latvia's forcible annexation by the USSR, resumed full diplomatic relations with Latvia on 2 September 1991.

In February 1992, Russia agreed to start withdrawing its troops from Latvia.

In August 1994 the last Russian troops withdrew from the Republic of Latvia.

Russia officially ended its military presence in Latvia in August 1998 following the decommissioning of the Skrunda-1 radar station, which was the last active Russian military radar in the Baltics. The last Russian troops withdrew from the station the following year.

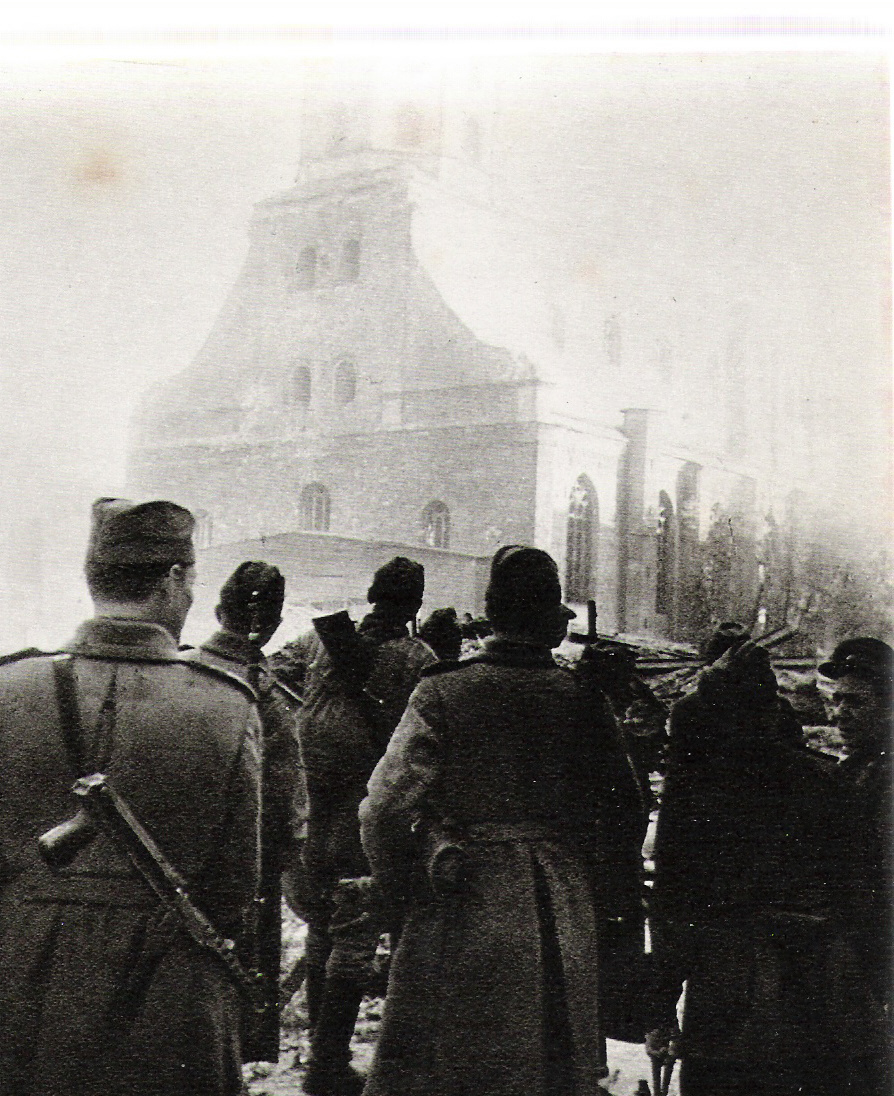
Soviet troops in Riga, October 1944

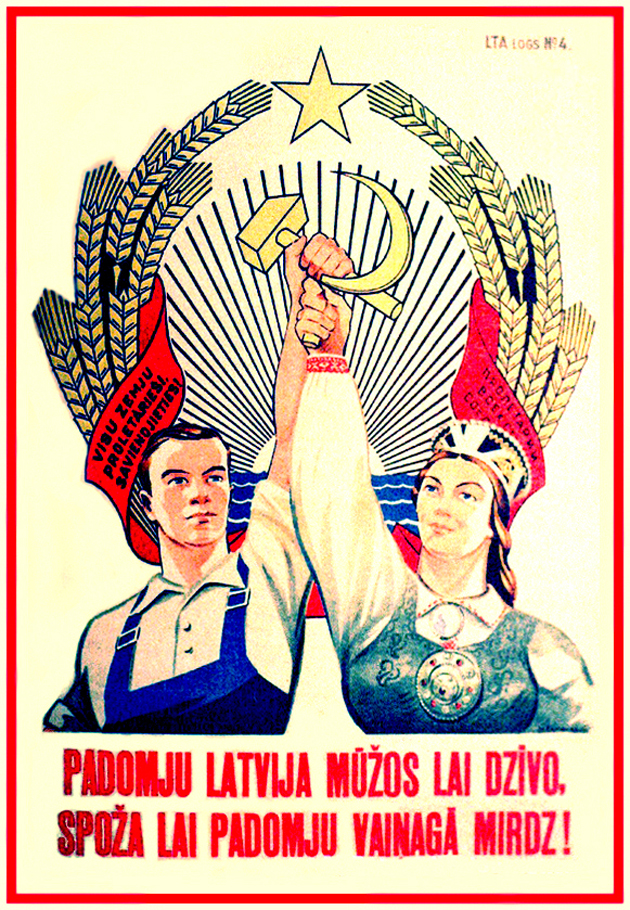
Soviet propaganda poster in Latvia, 1945

== Historical Soviet version of events ==
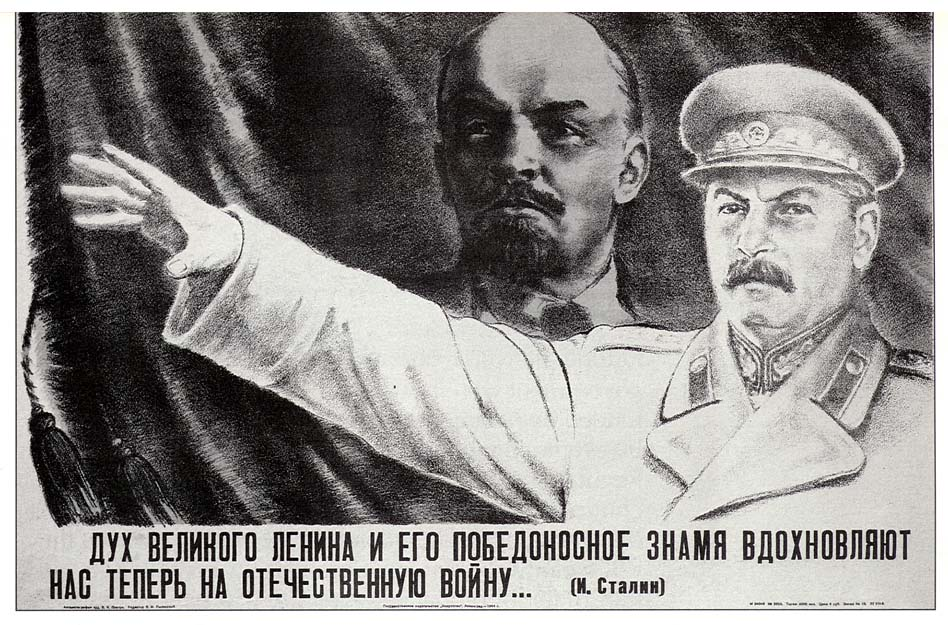
"The Spirit of Great Lenin and his victorious banner inspire us for the Great Patriotic War" (Stalin)

Up to the reassessment of Soviet history that began during the Perestroika, which led to the official condemnation of the 1939 secret protocol by the Soviet government, the Soviet position on the events of 1939–1940 is summarised as follows: the Government of the Soviet Union suggested to the Government of the Republic of Latvia that they conclude a treaty of mutual assistance between the two countries. Pressure from the Latvian working peoples forced the Latvian government to accept this offer. A Pact of Mutual Assistance was signed allowing the USSR to station a limited number of Red Army units in Latvia. Economic difficulties, dissatisfaction with the Latvian government policies "that had sabotaged fulfillment of the Pact and the Latvian government" and political orientation towards Nazi Germany led to a revolutionary situation culminating in June 1940. To guarantee fulfillment of the Pact, additional Soviet military units entered Latvia, welcomed by the Latvian workers who demanded the resignation of the bourgeoisie Latvian government and its fascist leader, Kārlis Ulmanis. That same June, under the leadership of the Latvian Communist Party, the Latvian workers held demonstrations, and on that day, the fascist government was overthrown, and a People's Government formed. Elections for the Latvian Parliament were held shortly thereafter in July 1940. The "Working People's Union", created by an initiative of the Latvian Communist Party, received the vast majority of the votes. The Parliament adopted the declaration of the restoration of Soviet power in Latvia and proclaimed the Latvian Soviet Socialist Republic. The parliament then declared Latvia's wish to freely and willingly join the USSR, adopting a resolution to that effect. That request was approved by the Supreme Soviet of the USSR and Latvia became a constituent republic of the USSR.

== Conflicting versions of history ==
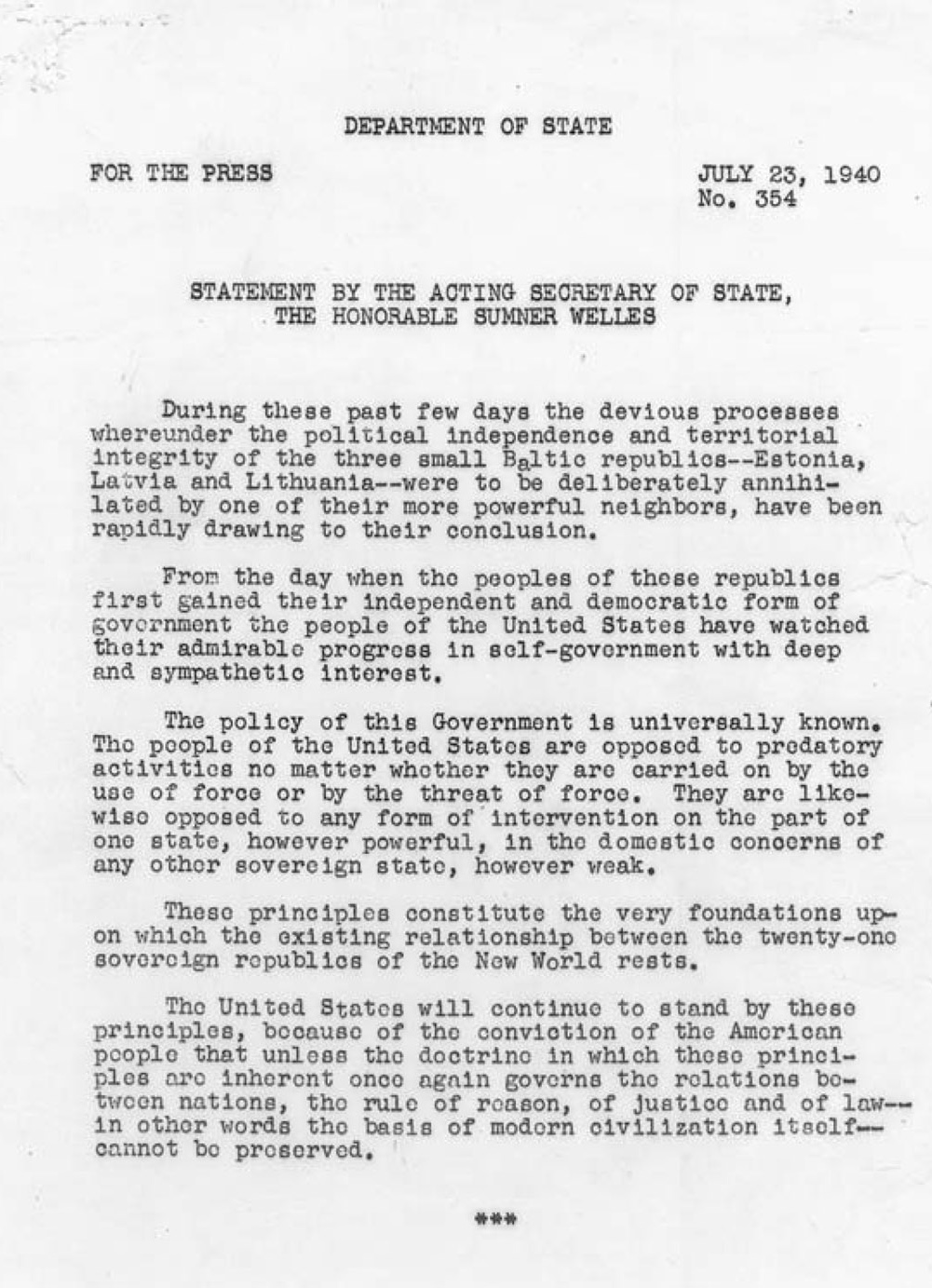
Welles Declaration, condemning the 1940 occupation by the Soviet Union of Latvia and the two other Baltic states, and refusing to recognize their annexation as Soviet Republics

The issue of the Soviet occupation and its motives and consequences remain a point of contention between the Baltic states and Russia. At the core lie different versions of the historical events during World War II and after: the Latvian (shared also by Estonia and Lithuania and widely espoused by Western historical scholarship) and the Soviet, which continues to be supported and defended by the government of Russia.

According to the European Court of Human Rights, the Government of Latvia, the United States, and the European Union, the occupation of Latvia by the USSR in 1940, and its subsequent re-incorporation in the Soviet Union in 1944, was illegal. According to this account, the lawful government of Latvia was overthrown in 1940 and Soviet rule was imposed by force. Subsequently, the Soviet Union conducted large-scale and systematic actions including murder and mass deportations against the Latvian population. Rigged elections were organized in which only Soviet-supported candidates were permitted to run; results were accidentally released to the Western press in London before the elections were even complete. As reported by Time in 1940, those who had failed to have their passports stamped for voting Latvia into the USSR were allowed to be shot in the back of the head by Soviet NKVD, The country remained occupied by the Soviet Union until restoration of its independence in 1991. The 48 years of Soviet occupation and annexation of the Baltic States was never recognized as legal by the Western democracies. The United States especially applied the earlier-adopted Stimson Doctrine to the issue of the Baltic states, leading to its becoming an established precedent in International Law.

While the Congress of People's Deputies of the Soviet Union condemned the annexation of Latvia and the other Baltic states prior to the dissolution of the USSR, the Russian Federation, the legal successor state of the USSR, does not recognize the forcible occupation of Latvia by the Soviet Union. Specifically in reference to Latvia, the Russian Duma passed a resolution to "remind the deputies of the Latvian Saeima that Latvia's being a part of the Soviet Union was grounded by fact and by law from the international juridical point of view". The government of Russia further maintains that the Soviet Union liberated Latvia from the Germans in 1944.

== Legacy ==
In 2000, Soviet Occupation Day—17 June—became a remembrance day in Latvia.

== See also ==
- Occupation of the Baltic states
- Occupation of Latvia by Nazi Germany
- European Court of Human Rights cases on Occupation of Baltic States
- United States resolution on the 90th anniversary of the Latvian Republic
- Litene
- Latvian fleet that fought for the Allies in World War II
- Occupation of the Latvian Republic Day

== General references ==
- Brecher, Michael; Jonathan Wilkenfeld (1997). A Study of Crisis. University of Michigan Press. p. 596. ISBN 0472108069.
- Enkenberg, Ilkka (2020). Talvisota Väreissä (in Finnish). Readme.fi. ISBN 978-952-373-053-3.
- Frucht, Richard (2005). Eastern Europe: An Introduction to the People, Lands, and Culture. ABC-CLIO. p. 132. ISBN 978-1-57607-800-6.
- O'Connor, Kevin (2003). The History of the Baltic States. Greenwood Publishing Group. pp. 113–145. ISBN 978-0-313-32355-3.
- Manninen, Ohto (2008). Miten Suomi valloitetaan: Puna-armeijan operaatiosuunnitelmat 1939–1944 [How to Conquer Finland: Operational Plans of the Red Army 1939–1944] (in Finnish). Edita. ISBN 978-951-37-5278-1.
- Plakans, Andrejs (1995). The Latvians: A Short History. Hoover Press. pp. 143–166. ISBN 978-0-8179-9302-3.
- Plakans, Andrejs (2007). Experiencing Totalitarianism: The Invasion and Occupation of Latvia by the USSR and Nazi Germany 1939–1991. AuthorHouse. p. 596. ISBN 978-1-4343-1573-1.
- Reiter, Dan (2009). How Wars End. Princeton University Press. ISBN 978-0691140605.
- Rislakki, Jukka (2008). The Case for Latvia: Disinformation Campaigns Against a Small Nation. Rodopi. ISBN 978-90-420-2424-3.
- Tanner, Väinö (1956). The Winter War: Finland Against Russia, 1939–1940, Volume 312. Palo Alto: Stanford University Press.
- Trotter, William (2013). A Frozen Hell: The Russo-Finnish Winter War of 1939–1940. Algonquin Books.
- Trotter, William R. (2002) [1991]. The Winter War: The Russo–Finnish War of 1939–40 (5th ed.). Aurum Press. ISBN 1-85410-881-6.
- Wyman, David; Charles H. Rosenzveig (1996). The World Reacts to the Holocaust. JHU Press. pp. 365–381. ISBN 978-0-8018-4969-5.
