= Soviet Occupation Day =

Soviet Occupation Day may refer to:

- Soviet Occupation Day, Georgia, to recall the Red Army invasion of Georgia in 1921
- Soviet Occupation Day, Moldova
- Occupation of the Latvian Republic Day, to recall the Soviet occupation of Latvia in 1940
