= Semyon Krivoshein =

Soviet tank commander

Semyon Moiseevich Krivoshein
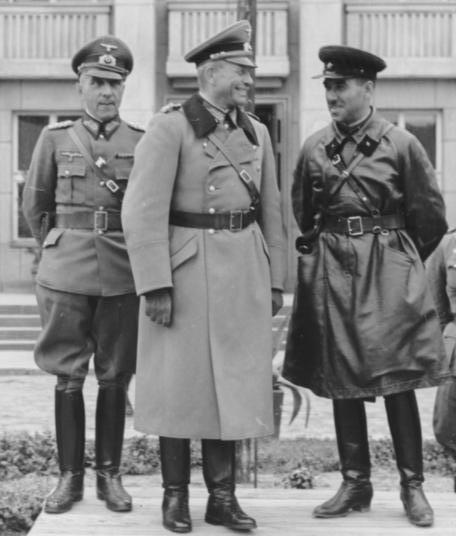
- Generalleutnant Mauritz von Wiktorin (left), General der Panzertruppe Heinz Guderian (center) and Kombrig Semyon Krivoshein (right) at the German–Soviet military parade in Brest-Litovsk in 1939
- Born: November 28, 1899; Voronezh, Russian Empire
- Died: September 16, 1978 (aged 78); Moscow, Soviet Union
- Military career
- Allegiance: Soviet Union
- Branch: Red Army
- Service years: 1918 — 1953
- Rank: Lieutenant General
- Conflicts: Russian Civil War; Spanish Civil War; Soviet–Japanese Border Wars; World War II; Eastern Front
- Awards: Hero of the Soviet Union; Order of Lenin (3); Order of the Red Banner (3); Order of Suvorov, 1st Class; Order of Kutuzov, 1st Class

Semyon Moiseevich Krivoshein (Russian: Семён Моисе́евич Кривоше́ин; November 28, 1899 – September 16, 1978) was a Soviet tank commander and General who played a vital part in the World War II reform of the Red Army tank forces and in the momentous clash between German and Soviet tanks in the Battle of Kursk.

== Early life and Russian Civil War ==
Krivoshein was born into the well-to-do family of a Jewish artisan shop owner and in 1917 graduated from a gymnasium, a Russian secondary school for the educated elite. In 1918 he enlisted in the Red Army to fight against the Whites in the Russian Civil War, seeing service in the 1st Cavalry Army of Semyon Budyonny.

== Tank commander in Spain and Siberia ==
After the end of the war in 1921, Krivoshein stayed in the army. With the introduction in the Red Army of tank forces, Krivoshein was chosen among most talented cavalry officers to master the new type of weapon. He was sent to study in the elite Frunze Military Academy, graduated in 1931 and served in the mechanized troops, rising in 1934 to commander of mechanized regiment. In 1936 he volunteered to fight in Spain on the side of the Republicans against nationalist General Francisco Franco, who was supported in Spain's civil war by both Fascist Italy and Nazi Germany. Krivoshein received the honor of becoming the first Soviet tank commander in Spain following his arrival alongside a small group of other Soviet volunteers and T-26 light tanks at the Republican port of Cartagena in October 1936.

In November–December 1936, he commanded tank forces of the Republican army in the Battle of Madrid and won praise for his performance. While the small tank force of a single brigade could not halt Franco's offence, his bold actions bolstered the morale of the Republicans.

In January 1937 Krivoshein was recalled to the Soviet Union to recuperate. He was promoted to kombrig and appointed commander of a mechanized brigade. In the summer of 1938, he led his brigade against the Japanese in the Battle of Lake Khasan.

== Second World War ==
=== September 1939–1940: war against Poland and attack on Finland ===
Following the conclusion of the Molotov–Ribbentrop Pact in August 1939, Germany and the Soviet Union invaded the Polish republic together. (Stalin's negotiations about non-aggression and a mutual diplomatic understanding between Germany and the USSR had tacitly aimed at the destruction of Poland. In a short and victorious campaign, the Soviet Union attacked Poland on September 17, 1939; the Poles had already been fighting off the German invasion since September 1). Krivoshein held command of the 29th Light Tank Brigade within the 4th Army of Vasily Chuikov. As Poland's leaders had by then concentrated their forces in the west and the Polish command had decided to offer only minimal resistance in the east in order to better meet the devastating attacks of Nazi Germany's advances against western Poland and the rapid German drive towards Warsaw, whose siege had already begun on September 16, just prior to the start of the Soviets' strike on the following day, the campaign passed relatively uneventfully for the troops until joining up with the Germans at Brest-Litovsk. Within two weeks the Soviets took more than 250,000 Polish prisoners of war.

The quick advance of the German army had taken some elements of the German forces beyond the agreed-upon demarcation line between the Germans and Soviets, the two armies coming face-to-face against each other just east of the Bug River. The encounter was unexpected, and the German and Soviet forces scuffled in minor attacks and counterattacks against one another along the Bug region. Upon penetrating the Bug region toward the city of Brest-Litovsk, Krivoshein found that the German troops had already occupied the town ahead of the advancing Red Army, and was invited by a party of German officers to the German headquarters to share breakfast with their commander, General Heinz Guderian. Krivoshein agreed, and following a brief talk, the German troops agreed to withdraw west to the previously agreed demarcation line and hand the city and its fortress to the Soviet forces.

During the meeting, Guderian proposed a joint parade of Soviet and German troops through the town, including a lineup of soldiers from both armies on the central square. Krivoshein declined, noting the exhaustion of the Soviet troops after a protracted march, but promised to supply a military band and a few battalions to accompany the parade of the withdrawing German troops, and agreed to Guderian's request that he and Guderian would stand and review the ceremony together. (Various Western historians and some Russian writers refer to this as the German–Soviet military parade in Brest-Litovsk.)

Krivoshein's next tour of duty with his tank brigade was the attack on Finland during the Winter War of 1939–40. The effective military of this smaller nation surprised the aggressors with unyielding resolve, but Krivoshein fought with distinction and his promotion was quick. In less than two years he rose from commander of a motorized rifle division and then a tank division to commander of tank forces for a key Baltic Special Military District. With the Red Army's introduction of the traditional Russian ranks for its highest commanding staff, he became, in 1940, a major-general. Krivoshein received command of the 25th Mechanized Corps in April 1941.

=== Reform of Soviet armored forces, 1941–1943 ===
After the German invasion of the Soviet Union on June 22, 1941, Krivoshein's 25th Mechanized Corps constantly re-deployed and took part in an unsuccessful counterattack in the Bykhov area.

In 1941–1943 Krivoshein was a head of Department of Training in the Main Directorate of the Red Army Tank Forces. The training of the Soviet tank crews had to respond to constantly changing demands to the crews such as introduction of the new tanks and search for the best size of tank formation in combat.

=== Battle of Kursk ===
In 1943, when the Red Army was preparing for the decisive Battle of Kursk, Krivoshein received command of the 3rd Mechanized Corps in Mikhail Katukov's 1st Tank Army of the Voronezh Front, commanded by Nikolai Vatutin. He and Katukov were considered the best in Red Army's armoured defensive tactics. The Soviet high command assigned to Krivoshein to fight in the first echelon in the south of the Kursk salient against German Army Group South which was commanded by Erich von Manstein. Krivoshein set up a defensive line in the town of Oboyan, and together with 6th Tank Corps stationed in Prokhorovka during the battle he faced the main weight of German assault, led by Hermann Hoth.

Krivoshein's forces were in a technical disadvantage to German heavy tanks. Against his corps, the Germans deployed the Tiger I tanks, armed with 88mm guns that could fire up to 2 kilometers. The Soviet at the time fielded a version of the T-34 tank which had a weaker 76.2mm gun with a shorter range of fire. On the first day of battle, on July 6, 1943, the Germans used Tigers together with Ferdinand assault guns in an attack against Krivoshein's 3rd Mechanized Corp. After fierce fighting, by the end of the day German forces penetrated Soviet defenses in the junction between the 3rd Mechanized Corps and 6th Tank Corps, but Soviet forces managed to stabilize the deteriorating situation. The next morning, on July 7, Hoth sent the bulk of German armor against Krivoshein's 3rd Mechanized Corp. In turn, Katukov and Vatutin sent Krivoshein reinforcements. In a pitched battle Krivoshein withstood the German assault.

On the next day, July 8, Manstein and Hoth in a desperate attempt to break the soviet lines decided on a renewed large scale armoured assault. Starting to suffer losses, and being pushed back under heavy German attacks, Krivoshein withdrew his corps to a new defense position but the Germans could not break through his line. The failure spelled doom for the German hopes of winning the engagement. Unable to seriously advance against Krivoshein's 3rd Mechanized Corp, on July 9, 1943, Hoth redirected his attack against the 6th Tank Corps in Prokhorovka, leaving his right flank open. On July 12, the 5th Guards Tank Army of Pavel Rotmistrov commenced a major flanking attack into Hoth's right flank, managing to bleed the surprised Hoth's forces. The 1st Tank Army then went on to commence a large scale counterattack. By the end of the day, Hoth, suffering from critical losses, retreated leaving the German Army with a defeat.

This is considered the point of no turning back for the German Army, which at this point managed to deplete its last major tank reserves necessary for large scale offensives.

Joseph Stalin bestowed on the 1st Tank Army and two of its most distinguished corps the highest Soviet honorific titles for military formation, the "guards". Krivoshein's 3rd Mechanized Corps became the 8th Guards Mechanized Corps. Krivoshein was promoted to Lieutenant General and was awarded the highest Soviet decoration for his outstanding generalship, the Order of Suvorov.

During the battle, the 1st Tank Army was severely weakened and had only 141 tanks left. Krivoshein's corps alone lost nearly 90% of its command cadre. In spite of these losses, Vatutin ordered the exhausted 1st Tank Army to go on the offensive in the Belgorod-Kharkiv operation but, after a spectacular initial advance, it was stalled and Stavka withdrew it in order to restore it for future combat. After receiving replacement goods and equipment, in December 1943 Krivoshein's corps was sent together with the rest of the 1st Guards Tank Army to the 1st Ukrainian Front of Ivan Konev. Krivoshein spearheaded Konev's offensive in expelling the Germans from the right bank Ukraine.

=== Belarus to Berlin ===
Krivoshein was severely wounded in the battle and was recovering for several months. Later in 1944 he received command of the 1st Mechanized Krasnograd Corps and fought in Operation Bagration, which smashed the German Army Group Centre in Belarus. Among many other Belarusian cities Krivoshein recaptured from the Germans was Brest.

In the last days of the war, in spring 1945, Krivoshein led his corps in vanguard of 1st Belorussian Front of the leading Soviet commander of World War II Georgy Zhukov in the Battle of Berlin. Stalin awarded to Zhukov the honor to take Berlin; it was a recognition of the exclusive standing of Krivoshein among Soviet armor generals that Zhukov entrusted him to lead the Soviet armies in the final Soviet triumph over Germany. Krivoshein slashed through the heavily fortified and echeloned German defenses in the critical Battle of Seelow Heights and fought his way to the Reichstag. For his outstanding combat leadership and personal courage in the capture of Berlin, Krivoshein received the highest Soviet war honor, the order of a Hero of the Soviet Union.

== Post-war life ==
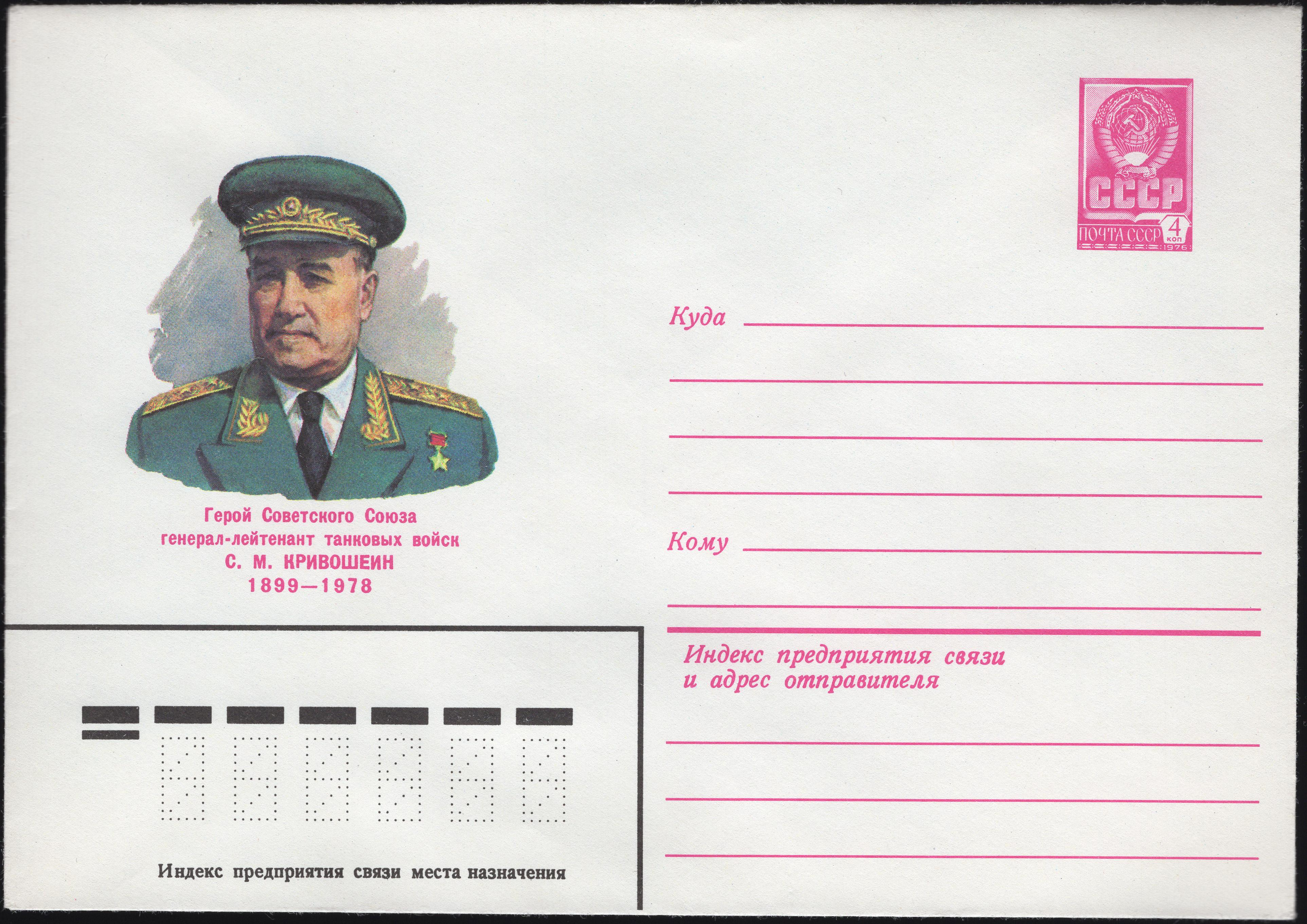
The Soviet Union 1979 Illustrated stamped envelope.

Krivoshein continued to command his corps until 1946 when he was appointed head of department at the M. V. Frunze Military Academy. In 1950 he moved to Odessa to command the mechanized and tank forces of the small Odessa Military District. In 1951 the Ministry of Defense selected him as a candidate for the Soviet Army higher command and sent him to study in the Higher Military Academy of the General Staff. Krivoshein graduated in 1952. The death of Stalin in March 1953 brought an end to Krivoshein's military career: as the new leadership began to reduce the huge Soviet army and, on May 4, 1953, the Soviet Ministry of Defense retired him after 35 years of service. He spent the last quarter century of his life writing four books of his war memoirs.

== Awards ==
- Hero of the Soviet Union (1945)
- Three Orders of Lenin
- Three Orders of the Red Banner
- Second Class Orders of Suvorov
- First Class Order of Kutuzov
- Order of the Red Star
- "Honorary Citizen of Brest"
- Jubilee Medal "In Commemoration of the 100th Anniversary since the Birth of Vladimir Il'ich Lenin"
- Medal "For the Victory over Germany in the Great Patriotic War 1941–1945"
- Jubilee Medal "Twenty Years of Victory in the Great Patriotic War 1941-1945"
- Jubilee Medal "Thirty Years of Victory in the Great Patriotic War 1941-1945"
- Medal "For the Capture of Berlin"
- Jubilee Medal "XX Years of the Workers' and Peasants' Red Army"
- Jubilee Medal "30 Years of the Soviet Army and Navy"
- Jubilee Medal "40 Years of the Armed Forces of the USSR"
- Jubilee Medal "50 Years of the Armed Forces of the USSR"
- Jubilee Medal "60 Years of the Armed Forces of the USSR"

== Bibliography ==
- F. D. Sverdlov, Evrei-generally Vooruzhennykh Sil SSSR (Moscow, 1993), pp. 118–119.
- Richard N. Armstrong, Red Army Tank Commanders: The Armored Guards (Atglen, PA, 1994).
- Rossiiskaia evreiskaia entsiklopedia, vol. 2 (Moscow, 1995), p. 92.
- David M. Glantz & Jonathan M. House, The Battle of Kursk (Lawrence, KS, 1999).
- Mark Shteinberg, Evrei v voinakh tysiachiletii (Moscow, Jerusalem, 2005), p. 38.
