= Occupation of the Latvian Republic Day =

Day of remembrance in Latvia

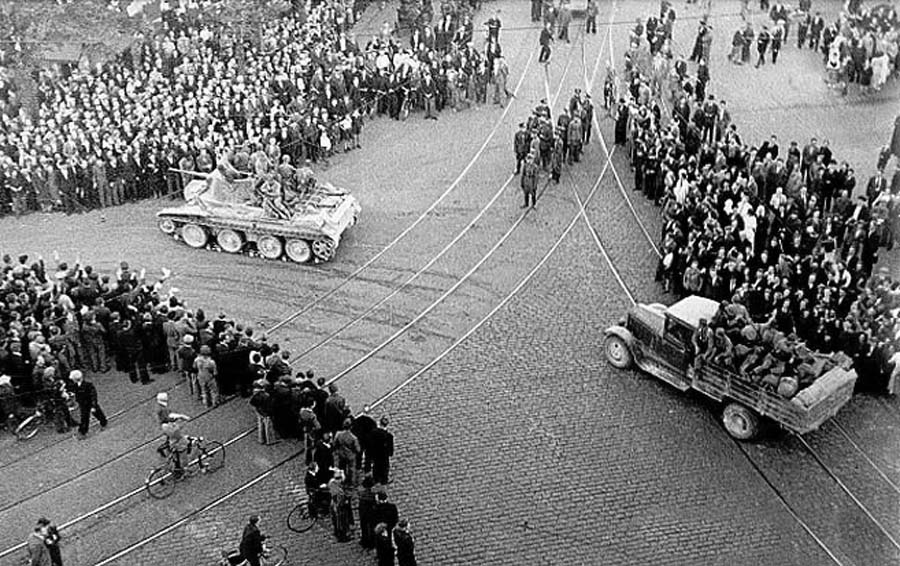
- Red Army entering Riga, June 17, 1940
- Also called: Latvian: Latvijas Republikas okupācijas diena
- Observed by: Latvia
- Significance: Commemoration of the Soviet occupation of Latvia in 1940
- Date: June 17
- Next time: 17 June 2026
- Frequency: annual

Occupation of the Latvian Republic Day (Latvian: Latvijas Republikas okupācijas diena) is an official day of remembrance in Latvia and is observed on June 17. It commemorates the Soviet occupation of Latvia in 1940.

== Overview ==
On June 17, 1940, Soviet troops invaded Latvia and occupied bridges, post/telephone, telegraph, and broadcasting offices. On the same day, Andrei Vishinski, Deputy Chairman of the Council of People's Commissars of the Soviet Union, introduced himself to President Kārlis Ulmanis as Soviet special envoy; two days later, Vishinski visited Ulmanis again, this time, to deliver the list, pre-approved by Moscow, of the new members of the cabinet of the Latvian government. Soon after, State administrators were liquidated and replaced by Soviet cadres, in which 34,250 Latvians were deported or killed and Latvia was incorporated into the Soviet Union as The Latvian Soviet Socialist Republic.

Soviet Occupation Day became an official remembrance day on May 18, 2000.

Moldova's interim president Mihai Ghimpu instituted in 2010 the Soviet Occupation Day holiday to remember the Soviet occupation on June 28, 1940, but the Constitutional Court cancelled his decree on July 12, 2010. Georgia followed the example and declared February 25 Soviet Occupation Day to recall the Red Army invasion of Georgia in 1921.

== See also ==
- Soviet occupation of Latvia in 1940
- Occupation of the Baltic states
- Red Army invasion of Georgia
- Soviet occupation of Bessarabia and Northern Bukovina
