= Prokhorovka =

Prokhorovka (Russian: Про́хоровка) is the name of several inhabited localities in Russia derived from the given name Prokhor.

Urban localities

- Prokhorovka, Belgorod Oblast, a settlement in Prokhorovsky District of Belgorod Oblast

Rural localities

- Prokhorovka, Irkutsk Oblast, a village in Osinsky District of Irkutsk Oblast
- Prokhorovka, Kaliningrad Oblast, a settlement in Nizovsky Rural Okrug of Guryevsky District of Kaliningrad Oblast
- Prokhorovka, Orenburg Oblast, a selo in Konstantinovsky Selsoviet of Sharlyksky District of Orenburg Oblast
- Prokhorovka, Rostov Oblast, a selo in Proletarskoye Rural Settlement of Krasnosulinsky District of Rostov Oblast
- Prokhorovka, Tula Oblast, a village in Prokhorovsky Rural Okrug of Novomoskovsky District of Tula Oblast
