= Soviet Occupation Day (Georgia) =

Holiday in Georgia

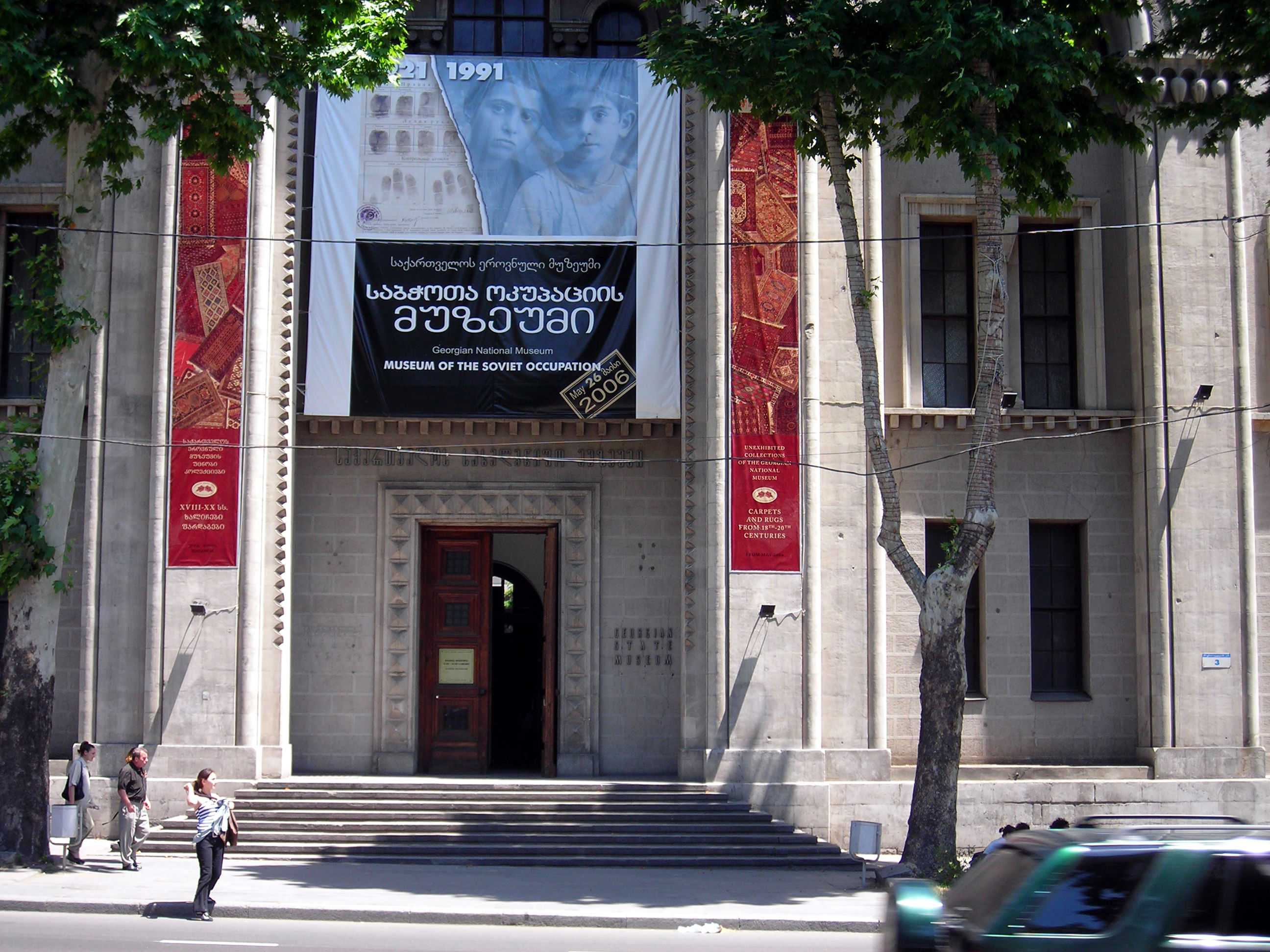
- Museum of the Soviet Occupation, Tbilisi
- Observed by: Georgia
- Date: 25 February
- Next time: 25 February 2027
- Frequency: annual

Soviet Occupation Day (Georgian: საბჭოთა ოკუპაციის დღე, sabch'ot'a okupats'iis dge) is a day of remembrance in the country of Georgia. It is observed annually on 25 February to commemorate the Red Army invasion of Georgia in 1921. The holiday was established in 2010, and its first observance was in 2011.

In February 1921, the Red Army entered Georgia, which was then the Menshevik-controlled Democratic Republic of Georgia following the post-1917 turmoil in Transcaucasia. The Georgian Menshevik army was defeated and the government fled the country. On 25 February 1921, the Red Army entered the capital Tbilisi and installed a communist government, led by Georgian Bolshevik Filipp Makharadze. The Georgian Soviet Socialist Republic was established on 25 February 1921. For the next 68 years, 25 February was celebrated as an official holiday, the Day of Establishment of Soviet Power in Georgia.

On 21 July 2010, Georgia declared 25 February Soviet Occupation Day to recall the invasion of Georgia in 1921. The Georgian parliament voted in favor of the government's initiative. The decision, endorsed unanimously by the Parliament of Georgia instructs the government to organize various memorial events on every 25 February and to fly national flags half-staff to commemorate, as the decision puts it, hundreds of thousands of victims of political repressions of the Communist occupying regime.

Georgia's establishment of Soviet Occupation Day followed the example of Moldova. Moldova's president Mihai Ghimpu instituted in 2010, Soviet Occupation Day to remember the Soviet occupation on 28 June 1940, but the Constitutional Court cancelled his decree on 12 July 2010. In Latvia the Occupation of the Latvian Republic Day was declared an official remembrance day on 18 May 2000; it is observed on 17 June.
