= German–Soviet military parade in Brest-Litovsk =

Military parade of German and Soviet troops during the 1939 invasion of Poland

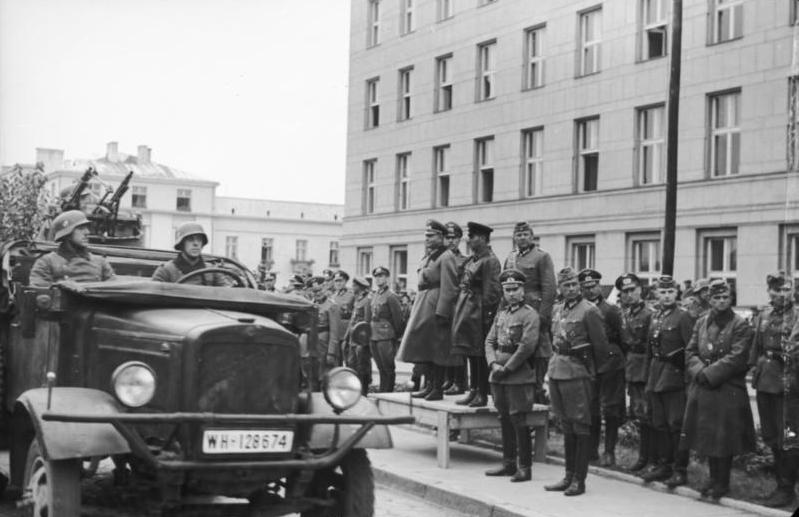
German troops passing the platform with the officers on September 22, 1939

The German–Soviet military parade in Brest-Litovsk was an official ceremony held by the troops of Nazi Germany and the Soviet Union on September 22, 1939, during the invasion of Poland in the city of Brest-Litovsk (Polish: Brześć nad Bugiem or Brześć Litewski, then in the Second Polish Republic, now Brest in Belarus). It marked the withdrawal of German troops to the demarcation line secretly agreed to in the Molotov–Ribbentrop Pact, and the handover of the city and its fortress to the Soviet Red Army.

== Background ==
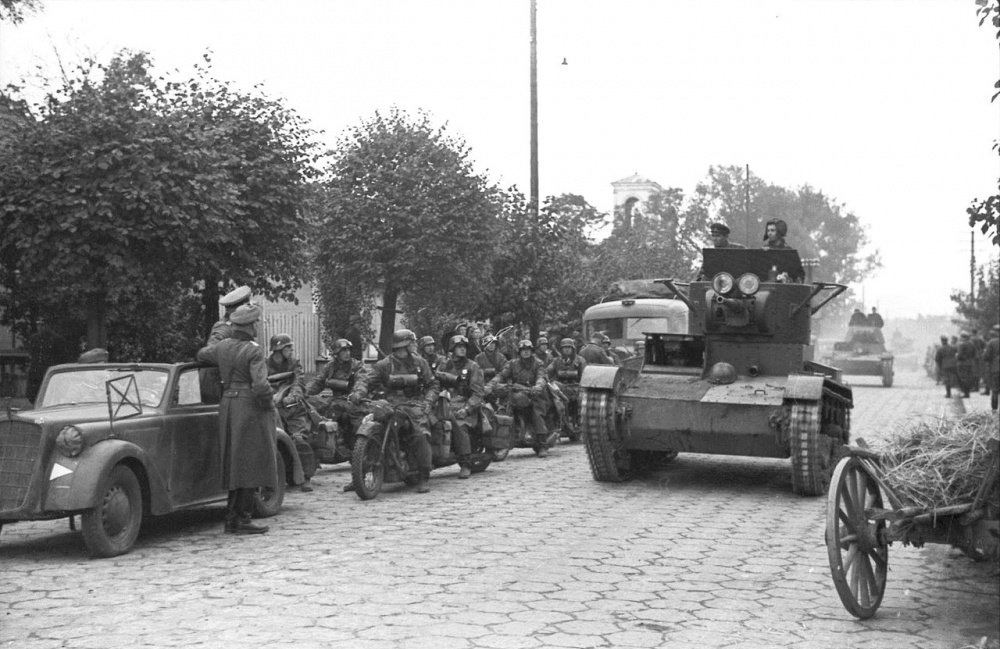
German motorcyclists giving way to rolling Soviet tanks

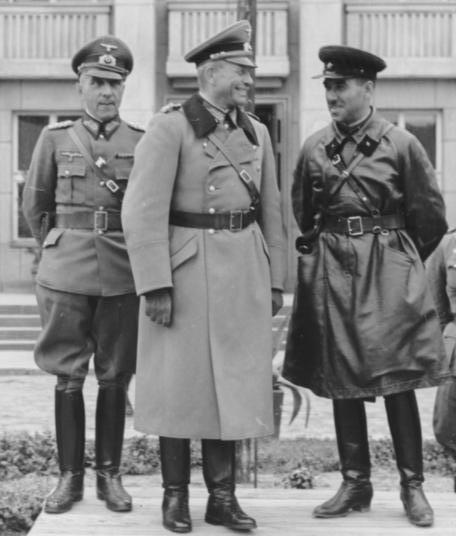
German officers Generalleutnant Mauritz von Wiktorin (left), General der Panzertruppe Heinz Guderian (centre) and Soviet Kombrig Semyon Krivoshein (right) standing on the platform

The secret protocol of the Molotov–Ribbentrop Pact, signed on August 23, 1939, defined the boundary between the German and Soviet "spheres of influence". However, during the invasion of Poland, some German forces, especially Heinz Guderian's XIX Corps, advanced beyond this line in pursuit of their tactical goals.

The XIX Corps approached Brest on September 13, 1939, and defeated the Polish resistance in the ensuing battle by September 17, establishing their base of operations in the city. During the following days, Guderian was informed, much to his chagrin, that the demarcation line between German and Soviet-controlled regions was drawn along the Bug River and that his forces were to withdraw behind this line by September 22.

On September 17, after Vasily Chuikov's 4th Army received the order to cross the Polish border, its 29th Tank Brigade, led by Kombrig Semyon Krivoshein, entered the town of Baranowicze. After taking the town and capturing a few thousand Polish soldiers, who were stationed there, his units kept on moving westward and reached the village of Prużany on 19 September.

On September 20, advance units of the 29th Tank Brigade encountered Guderian's forces at the village of Widomla, three days after the Soviet invasion of Poland and twenty days after the German invasion of Poland. The Soviet Brigade had seen little combat, as most of the fighting had already been over by this time.

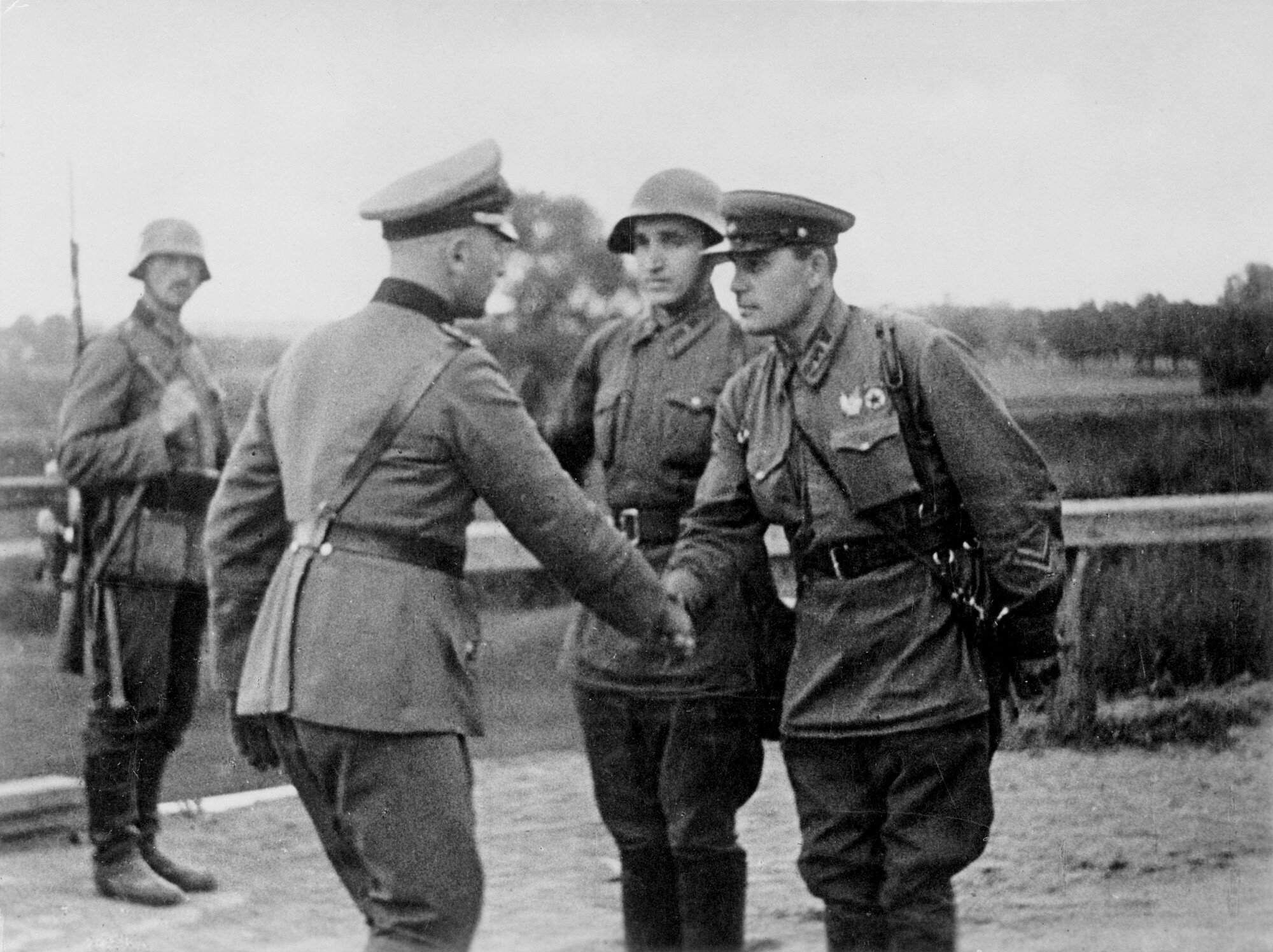
A German and a Soviet officer shaking hands.

According to Krivoshein, a reconnaissance unit returned with a group of 12 German officers, who identified themselves as part of Guderian's XIX Corps and explained that they too were moving in the direction of Brest. They were invited to Krivoshein's tent, who then proposed a toast to both commanders and invited the attending German officers to Moscow after they achieved a quick victory over "capitalist England". Through them, Krivoshein also sent warm greetings to the German general and made sure to approach the city from the opposite direction to that taken by the Wehrmacht.

Upon approaching the town on the morning of September 22, Krivoshein realized that Guderian had already established his headquarters there. Soon afterwards, Guderian's representatives arrived and greeted the "glorious Red Army" and its general. Following a short exchange of formalities, Krivoshein offered to visit Guderian and pay his respects to him personally. The offer was accepted, and Krivoshein was taken to the German headquarters to share breakfast with the German general.

During the meeting, Guderian proposed a joint parade of Soviet and German troops through the town, including a lineup of soldiers from both armies on the central square. Because the Soviet troops were tired after a long march, Krivoshein declined but promised to supply a military band and a few battalions and agreed to Guderian's request for both to stand and review the parade together.

== Parade ==
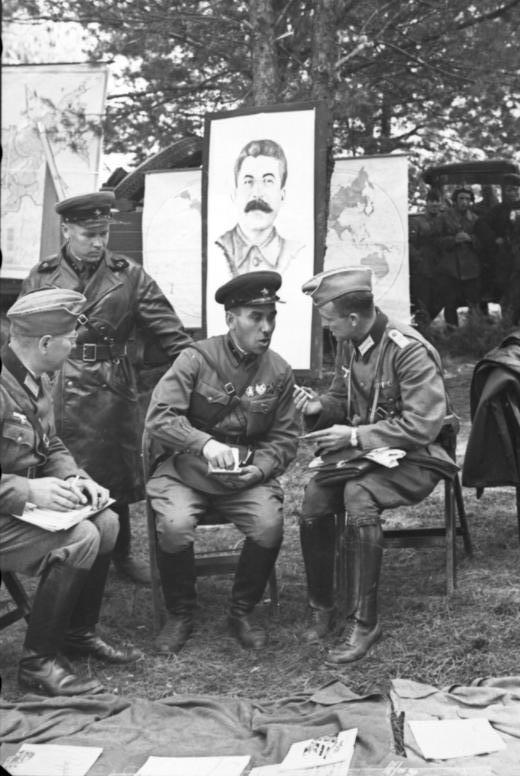
German and Soviet personnel amid Soviet propaganda material.

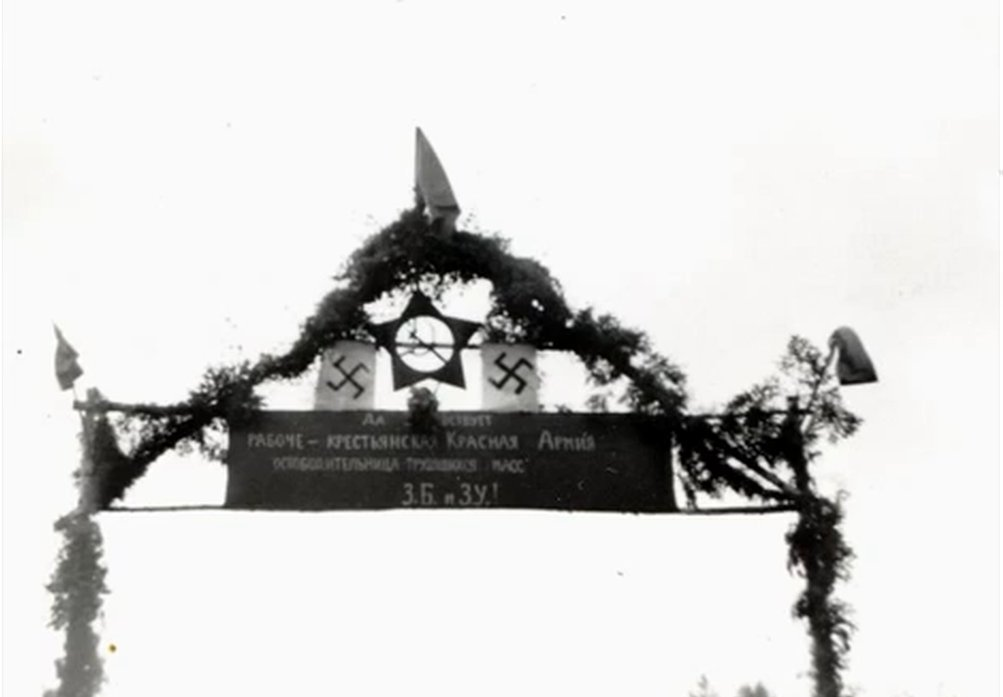
"Victory Arches" with swastikas and red stars

According to the initial agreement, the procedure included German and Soviet troops marching before their commanding officers followed by changing the flag, accompanied by national anthems of Germany and the Soviet Union. However, the Soviet commanding officer, Kombrig Semyon Krivoshein, wrote in his memoirs that he did not allow Soviet troops to pass alongside the German forces because he was afraid that Soviet troops, weary after a long march to Brest, would look inferior in comparison with the Germans, who had been in the city for several days. Instead, he suggested that the Soviet columns would enter the city separately and salute the leaving Germans whenever they meet.

The parade began at 16:00, and the "Victory Arches" were erected which the Soviet troops decorated with swastikas and red stars and through which German troops marched. The Soviets fielded the 4th Battalion of 29th Light Tank Brigade, which was the first unit of the Red Army to roll into the city. The Soviet and German generals paid homage to each other's armies and their respective victories over Polish forces.

== Aftermath ==
After the parade, described as amicable, the Germans withdrew to the western bank of the Bug, and the Soviets took control over the city, as well as the rest of Eastern Poland (Western Belarus and Western Ukraine).

== German–Soviet parades in other Polish cities ==
Several historic works published in the 1980s and 1990s discuss joint military parades of the Red Army and German Wehrmacht in other cities of occupied Poland such as Białystok, Grodno, Lwow and others.

For example, Russian historian Mikhail Semiryaga writes in his 1992 work Secrets of Stalin's diplomacy without citing any sources: "Joint parades with militaries of both countries as participants took place In Grodno, Brest, Pinsk and several other cities (Germans called them 'victory parades'). The parade in Grodno was supervised by Kombrig Vasily Chuikov." Another author, Alexander Nekrich, made a similar claim, taking some "photographs" as evidence: "The conclusion of military operations against Poland was marked by joint parades of German and Soviet militaries in Brest and Lwow in the first days of October [1939]."

In later works, Russian historians such as Mikhail Meltyukhov and Oleg Vishlyov dismiss the parades in other cities as "a myth", pointing to the fact that virtually no evidence has been found to confirm that those parades actually took place. In Lwow, Vishlyov states, it was impossible to organize a joint parade, as the Soviet troops were ordered to move to a distance of 20 km (12 mi) from the Germans after an accidental exchange of fire between the two sides, and no German units were present there at the time when the city capitulated to the Soviets.

== See also ==
- Polish territories annexed by Nazi Germany
- Polish territories annexed by the Soviet Union
