= Narew =

Narew Нараў, Нарев, Narevas
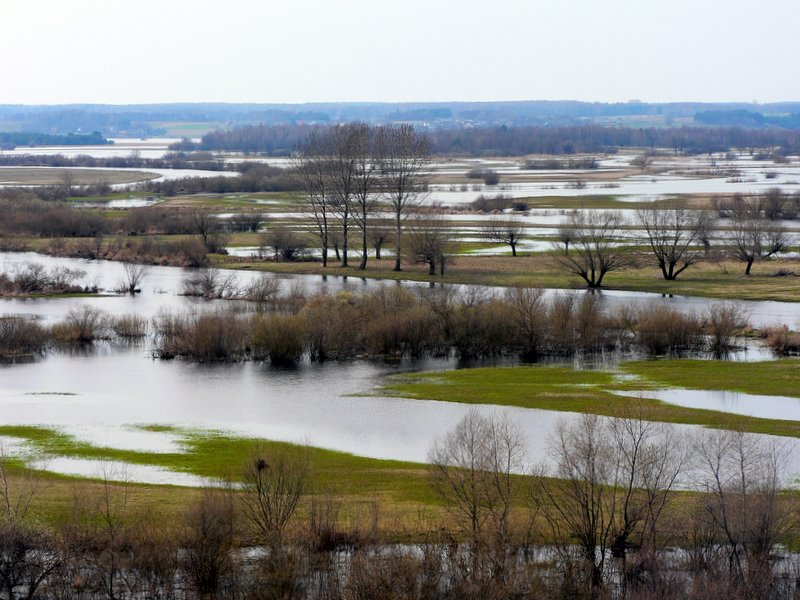
- Braided channels of the Narew at Strękowa Góra.

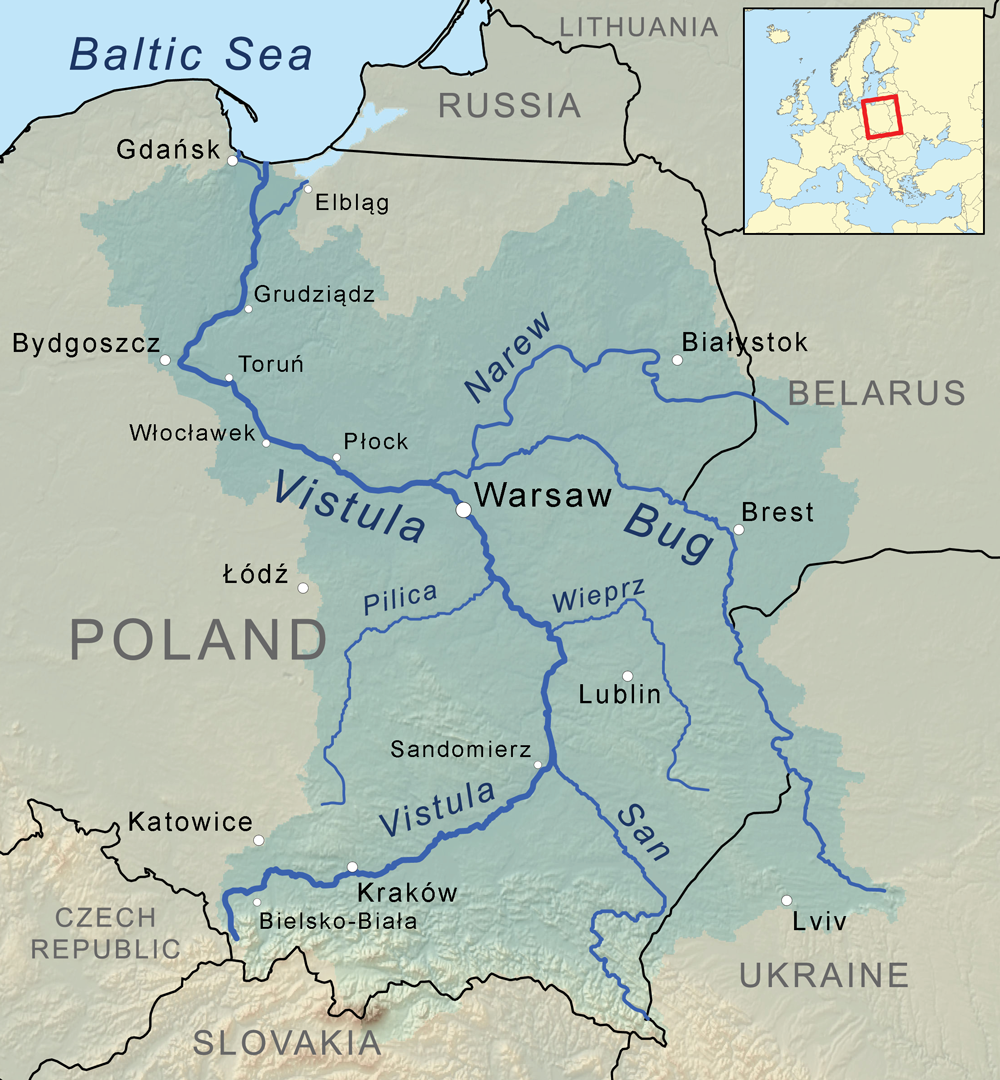
- Narew as part of the Vistula watershed.

Location
- Country: Poland, Belarus
- Cities: Choroszcz; Tykocin; Łomża; Ostrołęka; Pułtusk; Serock; Nowy Dwór Mazowiecki
- Voivodeships / Voblasts: Grodno, Podlaskie, Mazovian

Physical characteristics
- Source
  - location: north-eastern part of the Białowieża Forest near Dzikie Bagno, Belarus
  - coordinates: 52°52′24.68″N 24°13′8.87″E
  - elevation: 159 m (522 ft)
- Mouth: Vistula
  - location: Modlin (Nowy Dwór Mazowiecki), Poland
  - coordinates: 52°26′01″N 20°40′33″E
  - elevation: 70.7 m (232 ft)
- Length: 499 km (310 mi)
- Basin size: 74,527 km^{2} (28,775 sq mi)
- Discharge
  - location: mouth
  - average: 313 m^{3}/s (11,100 cu ft/s)
- Discharge
  - location: entering Pułtusk
  - average: 146 m^{3}/s (5,200 cu ft/s)

Basin features
- Progression: Vistula→ Baltic Sea

The Narew ([ˈnarɛf]; Belarusian: Нараў, romanized: Naraŭ; Lithuanian: Narevas or Naruva) is a 499-kilometre (310 mi) river primarily in north-eastern Poland. It is a tributary of the river Vistula. The Narew is one of Europe's few braided rivers, the term relating to the twisted channels resembling braided hair. Around 57 kilometres (35 mi) of the river flow through western Belarus.

== Etymology ==
The name of the river is from a Proto-Indo-European root *nr primarily associated with water (compare Neretva, Neris, Ner and Nur) or from a Lithuanian language verb nerti associated primarily with diving and flood.

== Name of the lower portion ==
The portion of the river between the junctions with the Western Bug and the Vistula is also known as the Bugonarew, Narwio-Bug, Narwo-Bug, Bugo-Narew, Narwiobug or Narwobug. At the confluence near Zegrze the Bug is 1.6× longer, drains a 1.4× larger basin, and has a slightly greater average discharge (158 m³/s at Wyszków vs 146 m³/s at Pułtusk for the Narew, both ~25 km above the junction). Thus the Bugonarew was often considered part of the Bug river and the Narew a right tributary of the Bug.

On December 27, 1962, Prime Minister Józef Cyrankiewicz abolished the name Bugonarew soon after the Zegrze Reservoir was constructed. Since then the river Bug has officially been considered part of the river Narew's system, with the Bug being a left tributary of the Narew (by this classification, the River Narew is a right tributary of the River Vistula). The name Bugonarew however is still used in some areas along its course, especially by the inhabitants of local towns, such as Pułtusk.

== Geography ==
The Narew flows through the geographical region of Europe known as the Wysoczyzny Podlasko – Białoruskie (English: Plateau of Podlasie and Belarus) located within the Podlaskie Voivodeship and Masovian Voivodeship of Poland and the Hrodna Voblast of Belarus.

Country	Length	Basin Area
Belarus	57 kilometres (35 mi)	
Poland	443 kilometres (275 mi)	53,846 square kilometres (20,790 sq mi)
Total	499 kilometres (310 mi)	74,527 square kilometres (28,775 sq mi)

The Narew is the fifth longest Polish river.

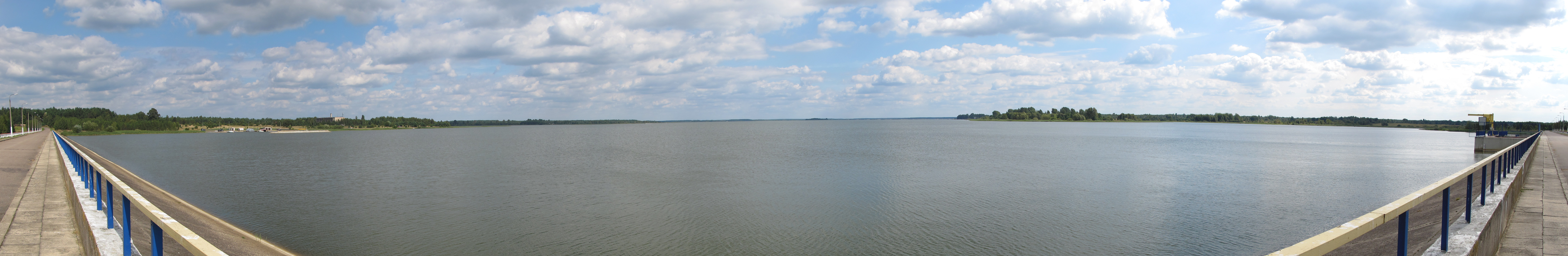
View from the road along Siemianówka reservoir near Bondary village, gmina Michałowo, Podlaskie voivodship, Poland

== Cities and towns ==
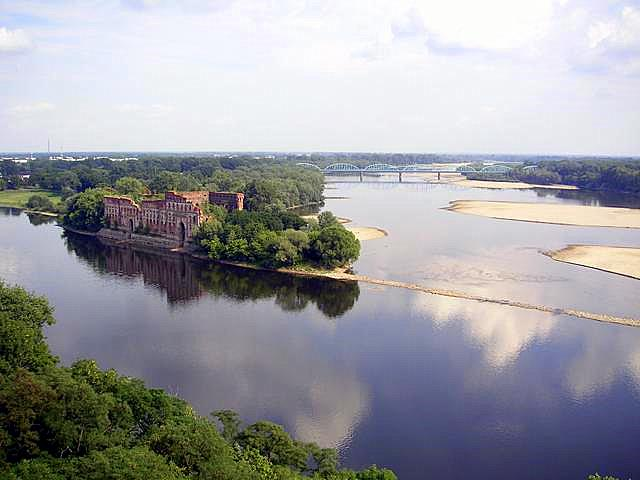
Confluence of the Narew and Vistula at Modlin

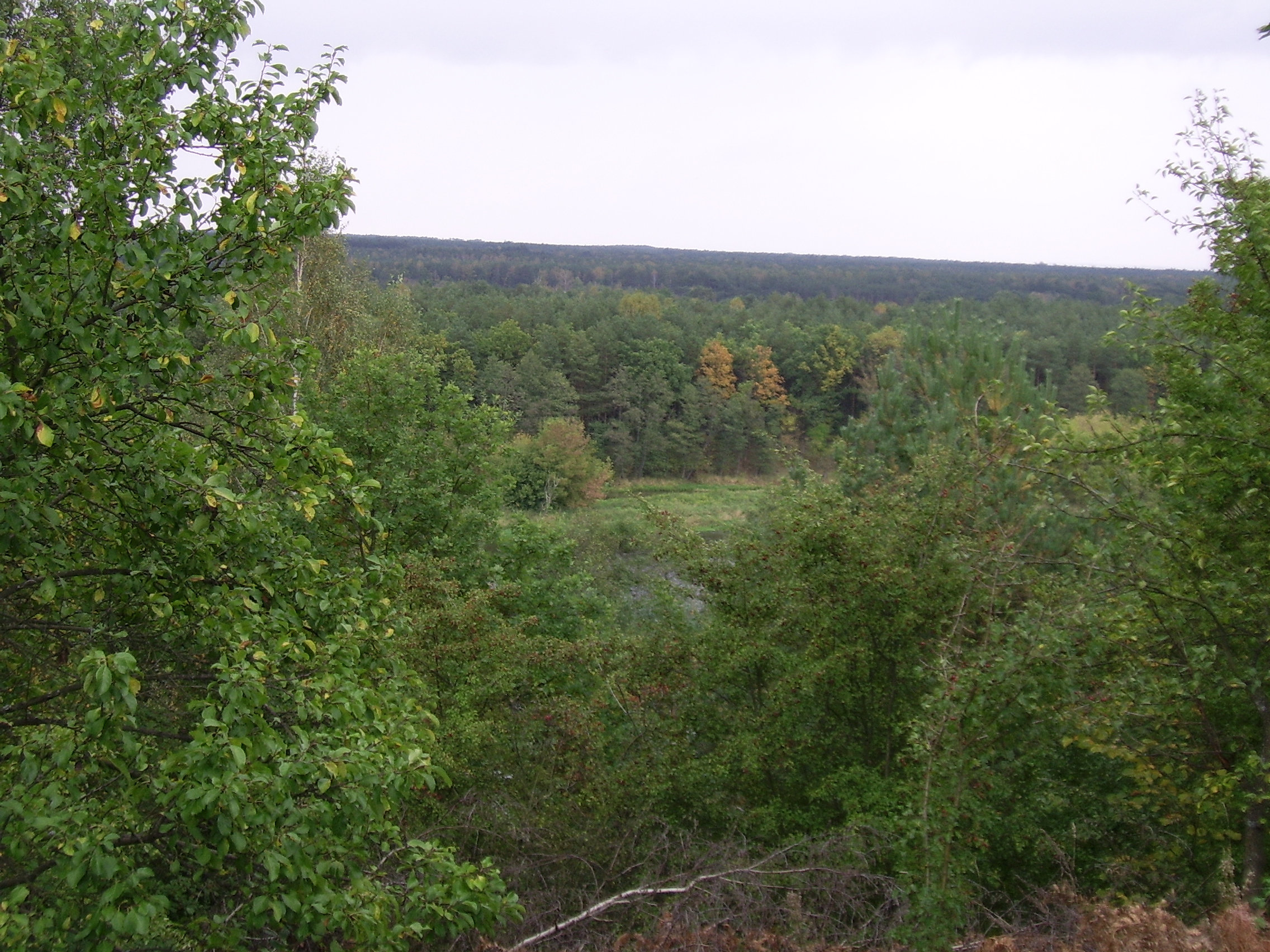
The valley of the river Narew taken from the high river bank at Paulinowo-Dzbądz (close to city Różan)

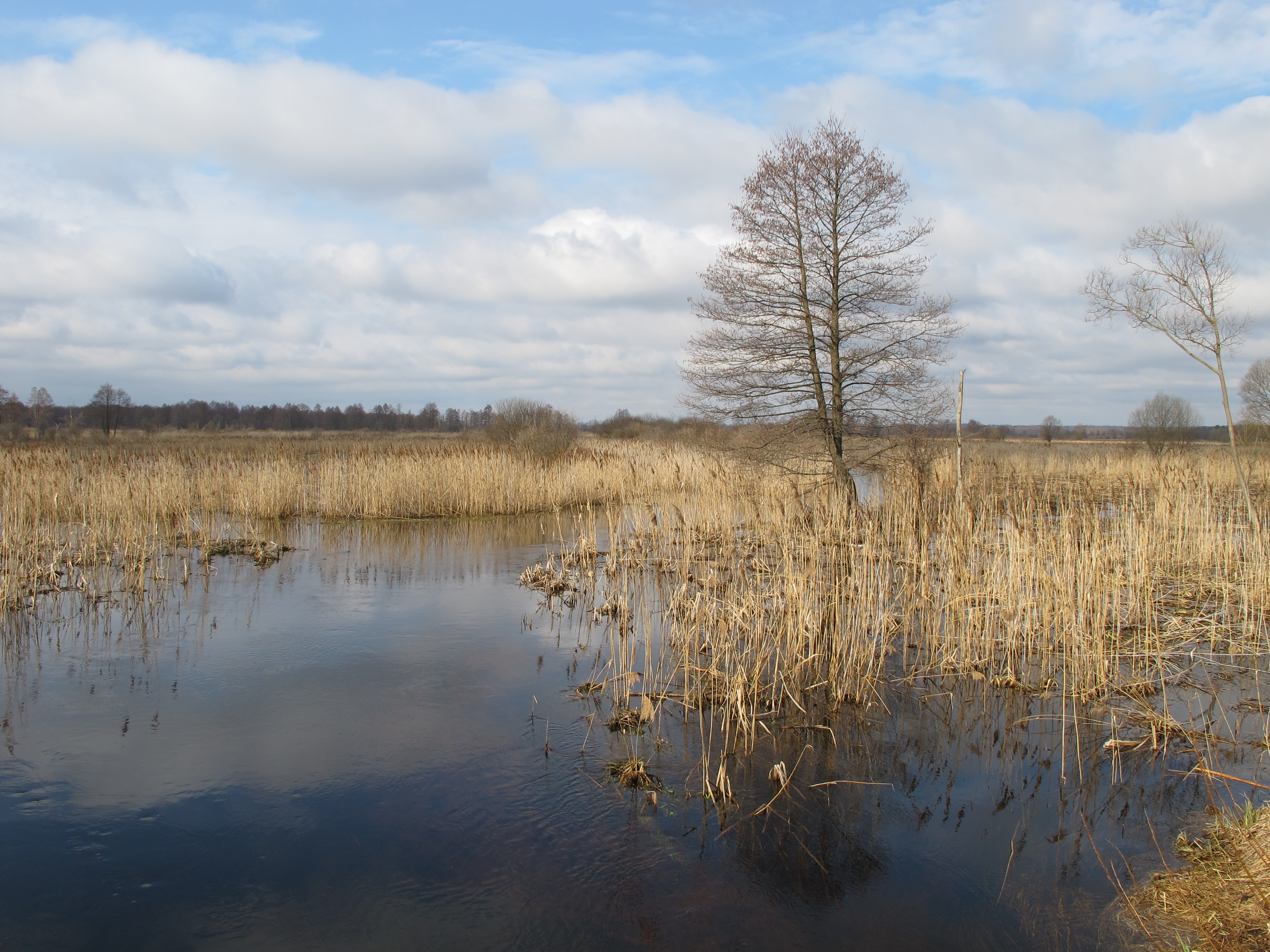
Marshes on the braided channels of the Narew's floodplains, near Pańki and Rzędziany

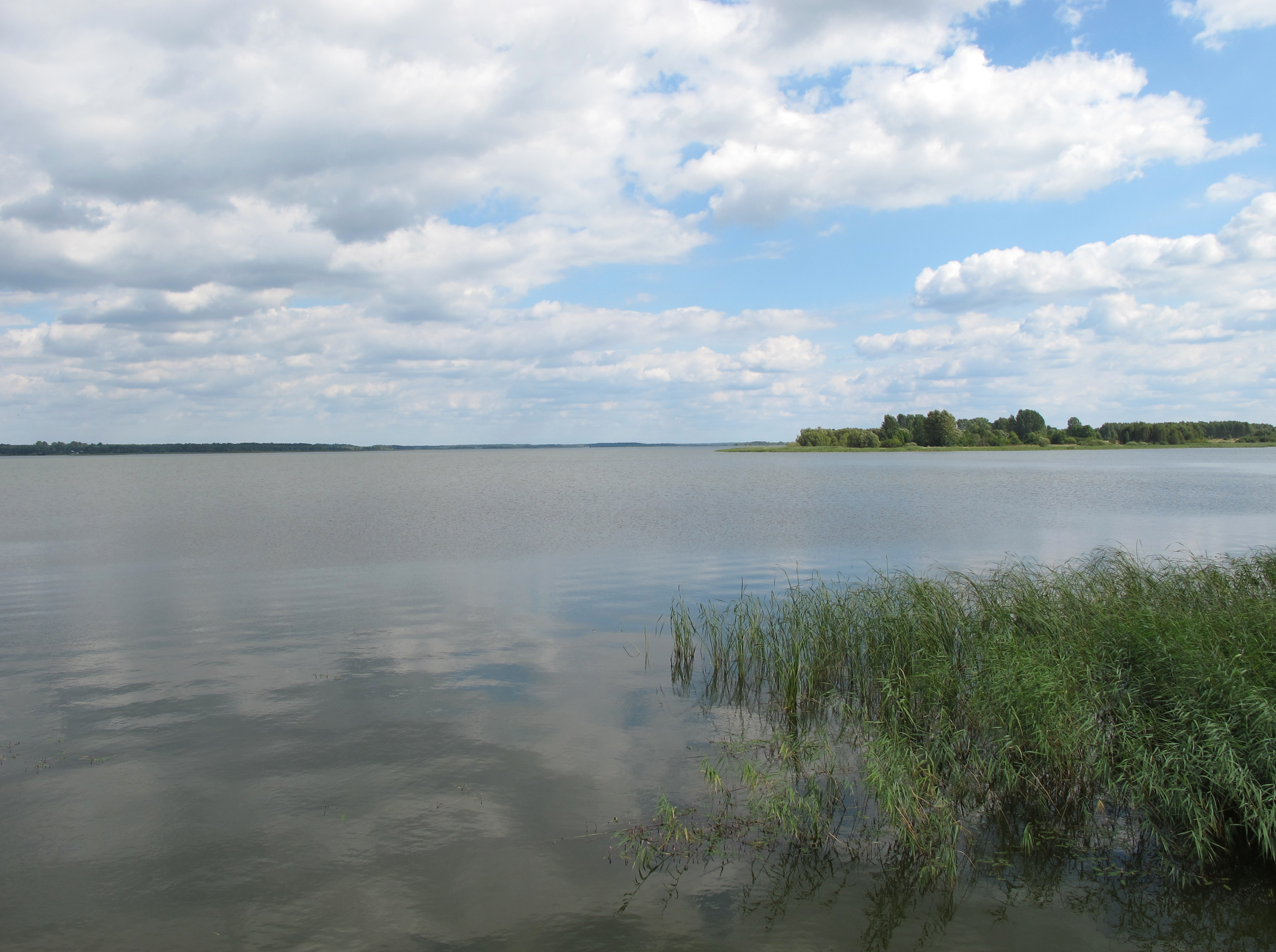
Siemianówka reservoir near Bondary village, gmina Michałowo, Podlaskie, Poland

Country Voivodeship	County	Gmina	Village	Comments
Belarus			Czoło - osada	
Podlaskie Voivodeship	Hajnowski	Narewka	Siemianówka	
Podlaskie Voivodeship	Białystok	Michałowo	Bondary	
Podlaskie Voivodeship	Hajnowski	Narew	Narew	
Podlaskie Voivodeship	Białystok	Zabłudów	Kaniuki	
Podlaskie Voivodeship	Białystok	Juchnowiec Kościelny	Czerewki	
Podlaskie Voivodeship	Bielsk	Wyszki	Strabla	
Podlaskie Voivodeship	białostocki	Suraż	Suraż	
Podlaskie Voivodeship	białostocki	Łapy	Uhowo	
Podlaskie Voivodeship	białostocki	Turośń Kościelna	Topilec	
Podlaskie Voivodeship	wysokomazowiecki	Kobylin-Borzymy	Kurowo	The seat of Narwiański Park Narodowy
Podlaskie Voivodeship	wysokomazowiecki	Sokoły	Waniewo	
Podlaskie Voivodeship	Białystok	Choroszcz	Choroszcz	
Podlaskie Voivodeship	moniecki	Krypno	Góra	
Podlaskie Voivodeship	Białystok	Tykocin	Tykocin	
Podlaskie Voivodeship	moniecki	Trzcianne	Zajki	
Podlaskie Voivodeship	Białystok	Zawady	Góra Strękowa	The fortifications defended by Captain Władysław Raginis during German Invasion of Poland
Podlaskie Voivodeship	Białystok	Zawady	Łaś-Toczyłowo	
Podlaskie Voivodeship	Łomża	Wizna	Wizna	
Podlaskie Voivodeship	Łomża	Piątnica	Drozdowo	The seat of Łomżyński Park Krajobrazowy Doliny Narwi and Museum of Nature
Podlaskie Voivodeship	Łomża	Łomża	Siemień Nadrzeczny	
Podlaskie Voivodeship	Łomża	Piątnica	Piątnica	
Podlaskie Voivodeship	Łomża		Łomża	
Podlaskie Voivodeship	kolneński	Mały Płock	Chludnie	
Podlaskie Voivodeship	Łomża	Nowogród	Nowogród	
Podlaskie Voivodeship	Łomża	Zbójna	Gontarze	
Podlaskie Voivodeship	Łomża	Miastkowo	Nowosiedliny	The last village in Podlaskie Voivodeship
Masovian Voivodeship	ostrołęcki	Lelis	Łęg Starościński	
Masovian Voivodeship	ostrołęcki	Rzekuń	Laskowiec	
Masovian Voivodeship	Ostrołęka		Ostrołęka	
Masovian Voivodeship	ostrołęcki	Olszewo-Borki	Ostrołęka	
Masovian Voivodeship	ostrołęcki	Rzekuń	Dzbenin	
Masovian Voivodeship	makowski	Różan	Różan	
Masovian Voivodeship	wyszkowski	Długosiodło	Ostrykół Dworski	
Masovian Voivodeship	makowski	Rzewnie	Nowe Łachy	
Masovian Voivodeship	wyszkowski	Rząśnik	Nowy Lubiel	
Masovian Voivodeship	pułtuski	Obryte	Zambski Kościelne	
Masovian Voivodeship	pułtuski	Pułtusk	Pułtusk	
Masovian Voivodeship	pułtuski	Pokrzywnica	Łubienica	
Masovian Voivodeship	pułtuski	Zatory	Stawinoga	
Masovian Voivodeship	legionowski	Serock	Serock	
Masovian Voivodeship	legionowski	Serock	Jadwisin	
Masovian Voivodeship	legionowski	Nieporęt	Nieporęt	
Masovian Voivodeship	legionowski	Serock	Dębe	
Masovian Voivodeship	legionowski	Wieliszew	Topolina	
Masovian Voivodeship	Nowy Dwór	Pomiechówek	Stare Orzechowo	
Masovian Voivodeship	Nowy Dwór		Nowy Dwór Mazowiecki	Narew flows into Vistula

== Tributaries ==
Left Bank	Right Bank	Municipality	Characteristics	Country
		Czoło	Bialowieza Forest	Belarus
	Bierieżanka		Bialowieza Forest Siemianówka Marshland	Poland
		Siemianówka	Siemianówka Marshland	Poland
		Bondary	Siemianówka Marshland	Poland
Narewka				Poland
	Olszanka			Poland
	Ruda	Narew		Poland
	Małynka			Poland
	Rudnia			Poland
	Czarna	Kaniuki		Poland
Łoknica				Poland
Orlanka		Czerewki		Poland
Strabelka		Strabla		Poland
Liza		Suraż	Narew National Park	Poland
Awissa		Łapy	Narew National Park	Poland
	Turośnianka		Narew National Park	Poland
	Niewodnica	Topilec	Narew National Park	Poland
		Waniewo	Narew National Park	Poland
		Kurowo	Narew National Park	Poland
	Horodnianka	Choroszcz	Narew National Park	Poland
	Supraśl	Złotoria		Poland
	Jaskranka	Góra		Poland
	Nareśl	Tykocin		Poland
Ślina		Targonie Wielkie		Poland
		Zajki		Poland
		Góra Strękowa		Poland
	Biebrza		Biebrza National Park	Poland
		Wizna		Poland
	Łojewek	Bronowo	Łomżyński Valley national Park	Poland
Gać			Łomżyński Valley national Park	Poland
	Narwica	Łomża Piątnica	Łomżyński Valley national Park	Poland
Łomżyczka				Poland
Lepacka Struga				Poland
	Pisa	Nowogród		Poland
Ruż		Gontarze		Poland
	Szkwa	Nowosiedliny		Poland
	Rozoga			Poland
Czeczotka		Ostrołęka		Poland
	Omulew	Olszewo-Borki		Poland
	Róż	Chełsty		Poland
		Różan		Poland
Orz		Brzóze Duże		Poland
Wymakracz		Ostrykół Dworski		Poland
	Orzyc	Zambski Kościelne		Poland
	Pełta	Pułtusk		Poland
Bug		Serock	Zegrze Reservoir	Poland
Rządza			Zegrze Reservoir	Poland
		Nieporęt	Zegrze Reservoir	Poland
		Topolina		Poland
	Wkra	Nowy Dwór Mazowiecki	mouth of the river at the Vistula	Poland

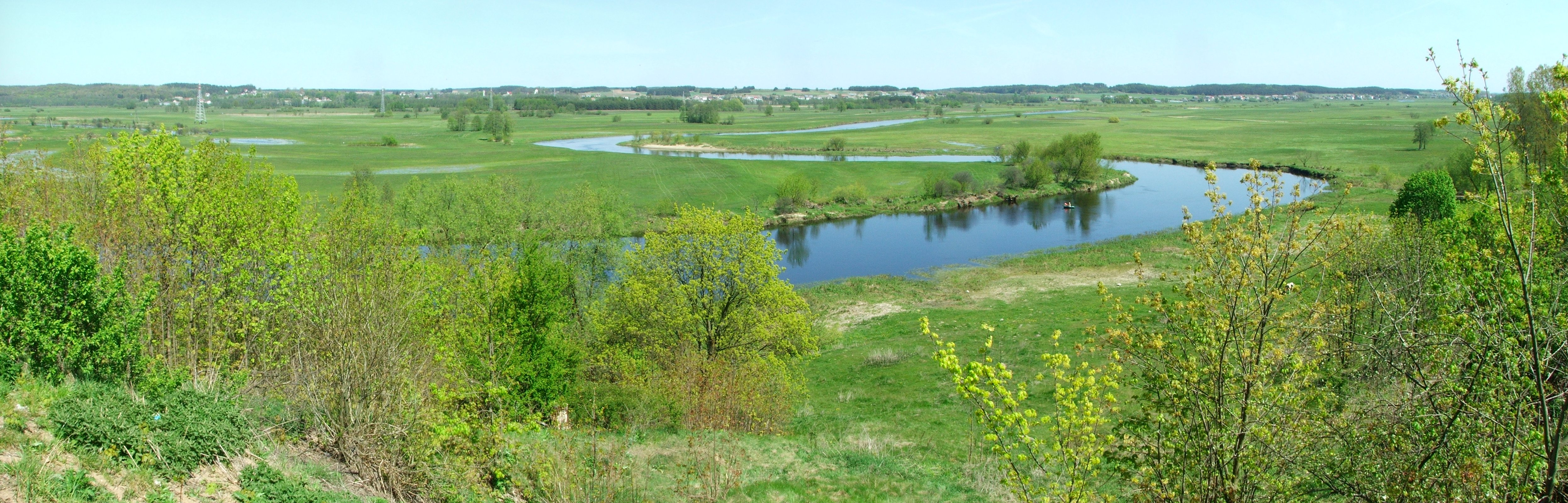
The Narew near Łomża. The river flows slowly, creating meanders

== History ==
On August 23, 1939, the Soviet Union and Germany signed the Molotov–Ribbentrop Pact, agreeing to divide Poland along the Narew, Vistula (Wisła), and San rivers.

On September 6, 1939, Polish military forces attempted to use the Narew as a defense line against German attack during the German invasion of Poland. This was abandoned the next day in favor of the Bug as German forces had already penetrated the defenses.

The Battle of Wizna was fought along the banks of the river between September 7 and September 10, 1939, between the forces of Poland and Germany during the initial stages of Invasion of Poland. Because it consisted of a small force holding a piece of fortified territory against a vastly larger invasion for three days at great cost before being annihilated with no known survivors, Wizna is sometimes referred to as a Polish Thermopylae in Polish culture.

On September 17, 1939, the USSR invaded Poland. By 28 September, the Soviet Army had reached the line of the rivers Narew, Bug River, Vistula and San – completing the division of Poland as negotiated in advance.

== See also ==
- Narew National Park
- Narew Landscape Park
- Rivers of Poland
- Geography of Poland
