= Kobylin (disambiguation) =

Kobylin or Gmina Kobylin, where "gmina" stands for an administrative district, may refer to the following places:

- Kobylin in Greater Poland Voivodeship (west-central Poland)
- Kobylin, Ciechanów County in Masovian Voivodeship (north-central Poland)
- Kobylin, Grójec County in Masovian Voivodeship (east-central Poland)
- Gmina Kobylin in Krotoszyn County, Greater Poland Voivodeship (west-central Poland)
- Kobylin, Łódź Voivodeship (central Poland)
- Kobylin, Maków County in Masovian Voivodeship (north-central Poland)
- Kobylin, Ostrołęka County in Masovian Voivodeship (east-central Poland)
- Kobylin, Podlaskie Voivodeship (north-east Poland)
- Kobylin, Warmian-Masurian Voivodeship (north-east Poland)
- Gmina Kobylin-Borzymy in Wysokie Mazowieckie County, Podlaskie Voivodeship (north-eastern Poland), with the following villages:
  - Kobylin-Borzymy
  - Kobylin-Cieszymy
  - Kobylin-Kruszewo
  - Kobylin-Kuleszki
  - Kobylin-Latki
  - Kobylin-Pieniążki
  - Kobylin-Pogorzałki

== See also ==
- Kobylin (surname)
