= Skirmish at Białaszewo =

Part of the January Uprising against Russia in 1863

- Part of January Uprising
Date	31 March 1863
Location	Białaszewo, Congress Poland 53°30′37″N 22°30′26″E
Result	Russian victory

Belligerents
(Poland) Polish insurgents	Russian Empire

Commanders and leaders
Józef Konstanty Ramotowski	Esau Matveyev

Strength
~200	~80 Cossacks

Casualties and losses
8 wounded 2 killed	unknown
- Location within Poland

The Skirmish at Białaszewo was a skirmish fought on the 31 March 1863 at Białaszewo, Congress Poland, between Józef Konstanty Ramotowski's ‘Wawra’ unit and Cossack Russian troops during the January Uprising.

== Background ==
Ramotowski began his march into the forests of the Augustów Primeval Forest on 25 March from the village of Komorowo near Ostrołęka. Using undercover transport and marching around the clock through the forests of Czerwony Bór, Chomentowo, Szczepankowo and Chojny, he bypassed Łomża and, with the Cossack group already behind him, arrived in Nowogród at dawn. To gain a certain advantage, he burned the bridge over the Narew River behind him and headed for Morgowniki, where he began dismantling the bridge over the Pisa River. However, the Russians, having captured Nowogród, began firing at the unit. Ramotowski, fearing that the attacker might try to cross the Narew River, changed the direction of his march and headed through Dębniki and Zbójna to Osowiec. Here the unit rested for a few hours, but with the Cossacks only 1-2 kilometres behind them, they set off through Laski and Gawrychy. After dismantling the bridge on the Pisa River, he set off through Żelazna Ruda and Rakowo to Korzeniste near Poryte, where he arrived on Sunday, 29 March, at around 11 p.m.

He ordered another few hours of rest and, supplied with food, footwear and firearms by the owner of the estate, Witold Kisielnicki, and having increased the ranks of his unit by a dozen or so volunteers, he set off at dawn, changing the direction of his march and passing through Piardy, Orlikowo, and Niecki, stopping in the evening in Przytuły. Almost simultaneously, Cossacks appeared on the surrounding hills near the village, who were the advance guard of Esau Matveyev, sent from Łomża with one company of the Sofia regiment, 80 Cossacks and horsemen in pursuit of Wawer. Avoiding combat, he continued his march through Kubra, Konopki, Brodowo and Karwowo Wissa, where he ordered another stop, and then, still pursued by Matveyev, marched through Mścichy and Klimaszewnica.

Józef Ramotowski unit arrived at the Białaszewo farmstead on Tuesday, 31 March, at around half past eight in the morning. The insurgents, exhausted by several days of forced marching, searched around the manor, village buildings and the inn in search of shelter and food. After setting up pickets, the unit decided to stay in the manor house. Welcomed by the owners of the estate, Kalikst and Wiktoria Świderski.

== The skirmish ==
Just an hour after the Ramotowski unit had arrived at Białaszewo, Russian troops appeared and opened fire on the insurgent positions. The size of the tsarist army is difficult to estimate. It was most likely the vanguard of Matveyev's unit, commanded by Baron Rosen, reinforced by a dozen or so horsemen from Szczuczyn. The Russians, not having their full forces at their disposal and not knowing the size of the insurgent forces, were afraid to storm the buildings for a long time and hid behind the forest wall firing at the Polish garrison. Józef Ramotowski was in a similar situation. Aware that his men were, hungry, cold, and exhausted by the strenuous march, were unable to engage in battle, he gave the order for the party to immediately march towards the ferry crossing in Osowiec, instructing a volunteer rifle unit, which had been ordered to hide in the manor buildings, to take on the attack.

The farmstead, surrounded by a wooden fence, was located on the southern edge of the village. The entrance to the estate's courtyard was through a gate between two wooden buildings, which were occupied by the main forces of the riflemen. With the exception of a few individuals who had previously served in other units, most of them were soldiers without any training and, worse still, armed mainly with hunting weapons. The shots, although quite frequent, were fired from poor-quality weapons and, it seems, only served to scare off the attackers. Time passed and the defenders ran out of ammunition. There were several dead and wounded. After about an hour of exchange of fire, the insurgents decided to leave the farm and, under the cover of buildings, began to retreat to a forest about 30–40 metres away. Seeing that the defensive fire was weakening, the Russians launched an attack.

This is how Józef Karpowicz, one of the participants, described the skirmish:

(…) I gathered around me a few Kurpiks with whom I had become friends. The kids were still only fourteen or fifteen years old, dressed in poor, torn clothes, shivering from the cold, carrying woven birch bark baskets slung over their backs, containing a piece of dry bread, gunpowder and bullets. Their rifles were tied with strings, but how they shot! (...)! And how cordial and noble these lads were! And how fierce they were towards the Muscovites! So, I and a few of my Kurpiks climbed onto the roof of the barn, from where we began firing deadly shots. As soon as a Muscovite emerged from the forest, we shot at him! This went on for a good while, when suddenly one of the Kurpiks shouted: The barn is on fire! I looked: indeed, at the opposite end of the spacious building, the thatched roof had caught fire, apparently set alight by the Cossacks who were already rampaging in the manor house. The fire spread rapidly, and there was no choice but to climb down as quickly as possible to avoid being burned alive. Nearby was a small pigsty for pigs, built entirely of brick and covered with tiles, so it was fireproof.We took shelter there. The pigsty had one narrow window, shaped like a shooting range, with a fairly wide view. We positioned ourselves there. The lads loaded and handed me the rifles, and I fired. At the same time, I sent one of my youngest companions, a clever lad, to scout the area. He returned soon: the manor house had been taken by the enemy and was in flames. Wawer managed to gather the scattered part of the army around him and retreated to the opposite forest (...) It was getting hotter and hotter in the barn, we could hear the rafters above us crackling as they caught fire. There was nothing left to do but flee quickly to save our lives. Unnoticed through the flames and smoke, we slipped out of the barn and, with the help of my Kurpiks, climbed over the fence surrounding the orchard (...). A young fir tree alley led through the orchard, dense and shady even in winter. We had to sneak through it with the utmost caution so as not to attract the attention of the Cossacks who were prowling everywhere. Once again, we had to get through a high fence – then we found ourselves in an open field (...)

The details of the retreat of the riflemen from the Białaszewo estate are unknown. Most likely, it was quite chaotic. Some of them, as can be seen in the example of Karpowicz and his young friends, were surprised by the invading Russians. However, as there were people in the unit who knew the local forest and could serve as guides, it can be assumed that thanks to them, a large group – travelling through the forests to Osowiec – reached the ferry crossing and joined Wawer's main forces. According to tradition, after leaving the farm, the group of riflemen retreated into the forests of Ruda and marched north, where they joined Ramotowski's unit a few days later. Karpowicz himself, as he further describes, after crossing the fence, hid with some of the unit in a field furrow. They then retreated into the forest and, after wandering for several hours, reached the hut of a forest ranger. Who gave them shelter and at dawn took them to Biebrza, where they found only the remains of the farmstead destroyed the previous day.

== Aftermath ==
After the riflemen left the farm, some of the Russians attacked the manor house. After showering the building with bullets, a group of soldiers broke in. Kalikst Świderski's eldest daughter, Aspazja, who stood in the way of one of the soldiers was killed with two bayonet thrusts. Kalikst and Wiktoria were severely beaten, their son-in-law Gustaw Świętosławski was wounded by two shots, and the women and children were robbed. Facing a threat to their lives, the whole family took refuge in the garden. Aspazja's death was described as follows by the diarist Izydor Bielicki:

The Russians reached the manor house and took terrible revenge (...) They approached the house itself and fired several dozen shots at the door. Wespazja Świderska fell victim to their barbarism. Oh! What a terrible sight it must have been when her grieving mother, seeing her lying on the ground, grabbed her by the shoulders to hide her from further insult and carried her to the garden, where she fainted. Here, everyone was again fired upon by three riflemen standing in the courtyard. Other soldiers organised a hunt for the farm's inhabitants, searching the buildings for rebels. They treated Jan Karasi, who was over 60 years old, cruelly, mutilating him in a brutal manner before killing him.

The Russian troops looted the manor house and outbuildings eventually burning them down after. According to Świderski's account, the soldiers' lawlessness lasted about an hour.

The murders and looting committed by Russian troops on Kalikst Świderski's estate caused a stir in the Augustów Governorate and in the foreign press. They also had certain legal consequences. Świderski submitted a report on the events of 31 March to the civil governor Józef Korytkowski. The latter added his own comments to the letter and forwarded it to the Director-General of Internal Affairs in Warsaw with a request for an explanation and compensation for the losses suffered by Kalikst Świderski where he was awarded the first part of the compensation (2/3 of the insurance amount) for the burnt buildings.

Casualties from the skirmish number two dead and 8 wounded for the insurgents while the Russian casualties are unknown.

== Legacy ==
In 1933, a stone obelisk commemorating the tragic events of 1863 and their victims was erected in the former manor courtyard.
