= Kaniuk =

Kaniuk or Kanyuk (Cyrillic: Канюк) is a surname. It originated from Slavic terms for some bird of prey species. The surname may refer to:

- Alyaksandr Kanyuk (born 1960), Belarusian statesman, former Prosecutor General of Belarus
- Andrii Kaniuk (born 1983), Ukrainian footballer
- Anna Kaniuk (born 1984), Belarusian athlete
- Gidi Kanyuk (born 1993), Israeli footballer
- Yoram Kaniuk (1930–2013), Israeli writer

== See also ==
- Kaniuki, villages in Poland
- Kanyuki, village in Russia
