= Narew National Park =

National park in Poland

- Polish: Narwiański Park Narodowy
- IUCN category II (national park)
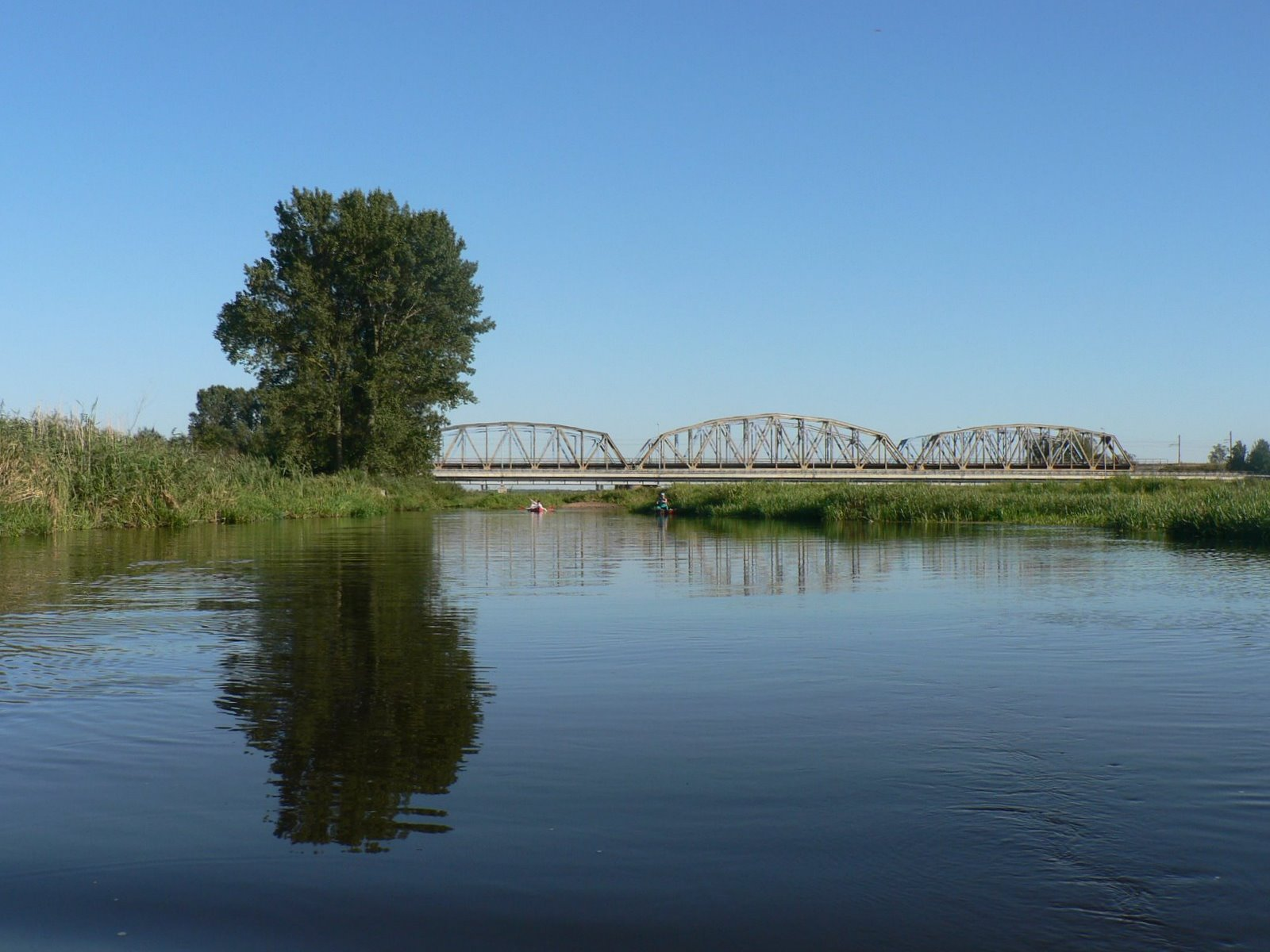
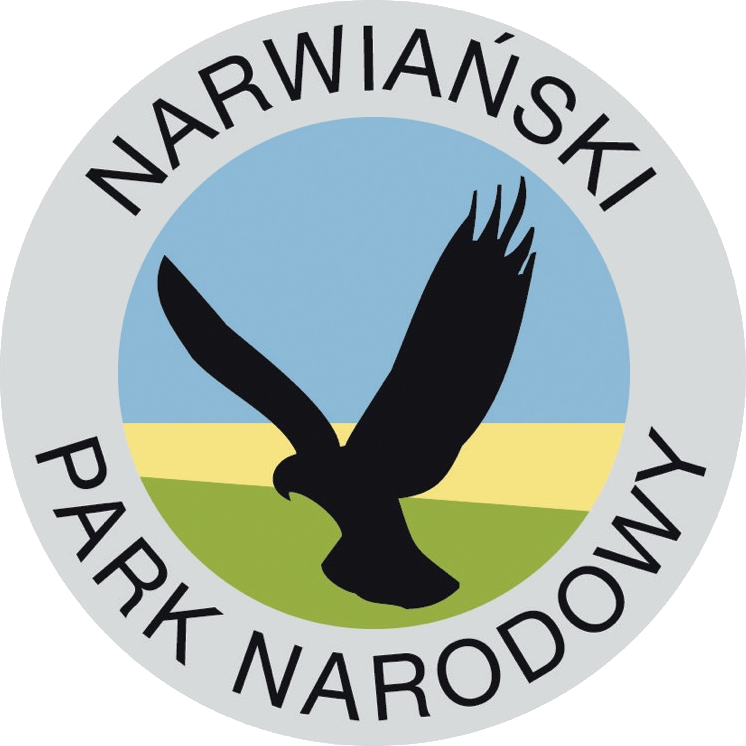
- Narew River at Uhowo, Poland Park logo with western marsh harrier

- Location within Poland
- Location: Podlaskie Voivodeship, Poland
- Nearest city: Kurowo
- Coordinates: 53°03′00″N 22°24′15″E
- Area: 73.5 km^{2} (28.4 sq mi)
- Established: (1985) 1996
- Governing body: Ministry of the Environment
- Website: Official website

Ramsar Wetland
- Official name: Narew River National Park
- Designated: 29 October 2002
- Reference no.: 1564

Narew National Park (Polish: Narwiański Park Narodowy) is a National Park in Podlaskie Voivodeship, north-eastern Poland, created in 1996. Prior to that, its area was part of the Narew Landscape Park.

The park is a 35 kilometres (22 mi) section of the Narew River. It is a swampy valley with moraine hills typical of a braided river. Depending on the season and the level of the water table, several riparian area ecosystems are available, including swamps, tussocks with surrounding black alder (Latin: Alnus glutinosa) and white willow (Latin: Salix alba) forested areas. The total area of the park is 73.5 square kilometres (28.4 sq mi), of which only 20.57 square kilometres (7.94 sq mi) is state-owned. The rest is distributed across 12,000 different plots of privately held land, mostly by small-scale farmers.

The park covers the Upper Narew Valley, a swampy area between the towns of Suraż and Rzędziany. Around 98% of the park's area consists of rivers, periodically flooded lands, or wetlands. The Narew is the park's main river, which splits in the area into many river beds, but also numerous smaller rivers, such as Liza, Szeroka Struga, Awissa, Kurówka, Kowalówka, Turośnianka and Czaplinianka.

The park's landscape is predominantly made up by many varieties of marshes, reed beds, and there are also meadows and forests. The Narew Valley is a haven for birds—there are 213 species of them, including those unique for the area. Mammals are represented by around 36 species, among them some elk and otter as well as numerous beavers—around 260 of them. The park's waters are full of fish—27 species—as well as amphibians. When it comes to invertebrates, the park plays host to over 200 species of rotifers, over 70 species of plankton, and 66 species of butterfly (so around 40% of the amount of butterfly species present all across Poland). The Park is a wetland site protected under the Ramsar convention.

Cultural attractions of the park are mostly represented by buildings such as numerous traditional village huts, ancient crosses by the roads and windmills. One of the Park's attractions is a private archaeological museum, owned by Władysław Litwinczuk. The park also includes an antique manor house at Kurowo.
