= Pianki =

Pianki may refer to the following places:

- Pianki, Masovian Voivodeship (north-central Poland)
- Pianki, Podlaskie Voivodeship (north-east Poland)
- Pianki, Warmian-Masurian Voivodeship (north-east Poland)
