= Chraboły, Bielsk County =

Chraboły
- Village
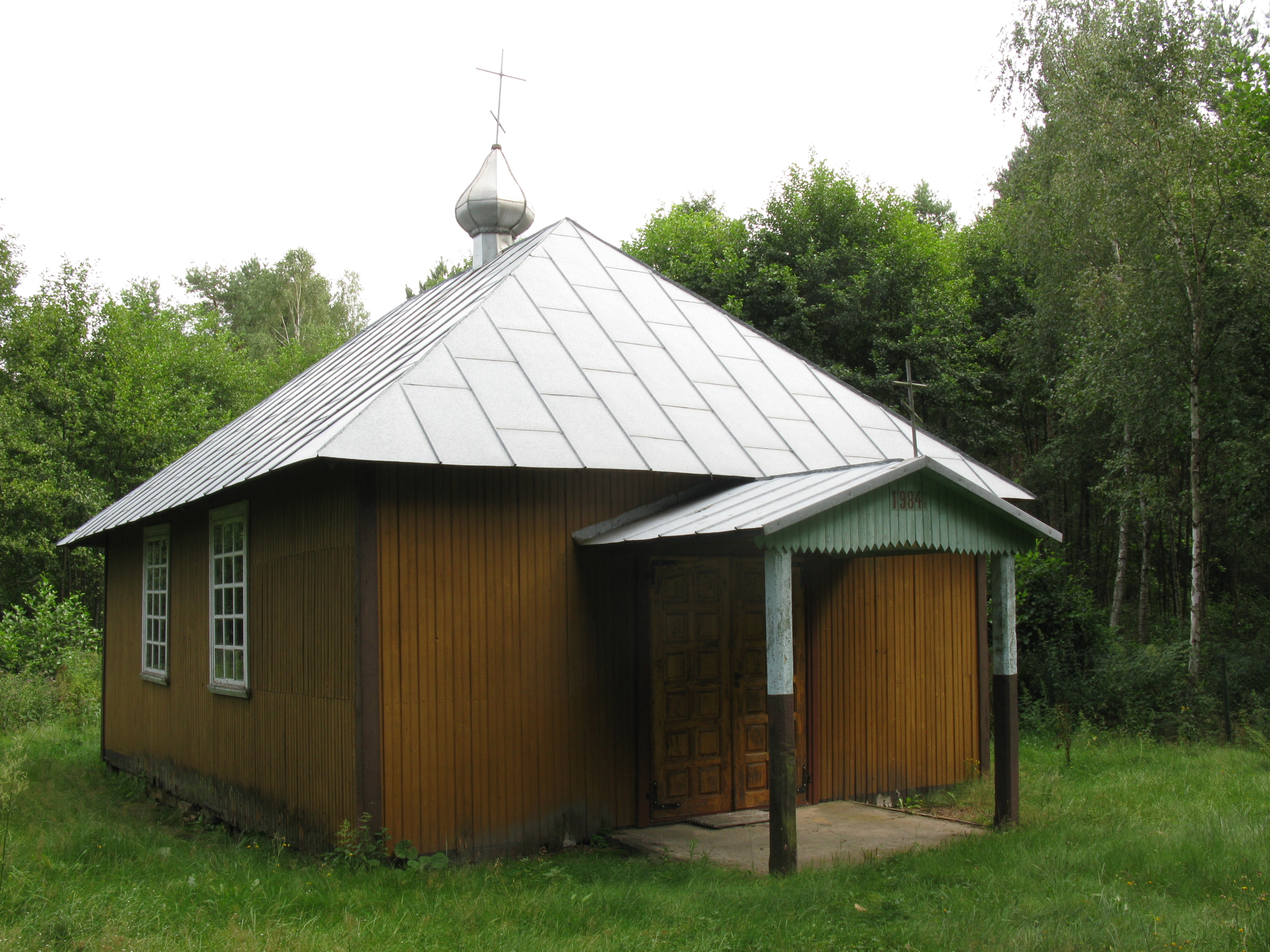
- Orthodox chapel of Saint John the Evangelist

- Location within Poland
- Coordinates: 52°51′31″N 23°11′43″E
- Country: Poland
- Voivodeship: Podlaskie
- County: Bielsk
- Gmina: Bielsk Podlaski
- Time zone: UTC+1 (CET)
  - Summer (DST): UTC+2 (CEST)

Chraboły [xraˈbɔwɨ] is a village in the administrative district of Gmina Bielsk Podlaski, within Bielsk County, Podlaskie Voivodeship, in north-eastern Poland.

The village lies by the river Orlanka.

== History ==
Three Polish citizens were murdered by Nazi Germany in the village during World War II.
