= Kobylin-Latki =

- Village
- Location within Poland
- Coordinates: 53°05′53″N 22°40′11″E
- Country: Poland
- Voivodeship: Podlaskie
- County: Wysokie Mazowieckie
- Gmina: Kobylin-Borzymy
- Population (2021): 111

Kobylin-Latki [kɔˈbɨlin ˈlatki] is a village in the administrative district of Gmina Kobylin-Borzymy, within Wysokie Mazowieckie County, Podlaskie Voivodeship, in north-eastern Poland. The village had a population of 111 as of 2021, down from 114 in 2002.

== History ==
Kobylin-Latki was one of a cluster of villages sharing the name Kobylin, which were settled by petty nobility from Mazovia from the 14th century. According to the Słownik geograficzny Królestwa Polskiego, the village takes its name from Wojciech Latko of Kobylin, who lived in the first half of the 16th century. By the late 19th century the villages of Kobylin-Latki, Kobylin-Borzymy and Kobylin-Pieniążki had expanded into a single built-up settlement.

Before the 1954 administrative reform, Kobylin-Latki formed a gromada within the gmina of Kobylin. On 4 October 1954 the gromada was merged with eleven others from the same gmina to form the new gromada of Kobylin-Borzymy. By Resolution No. XXI/72/72 of the Voivodeship National Council of 9 December 1972, Kobylin-Latki became a constituent sołectwo of the new Gmina Kobylin-Borzymy.
