= Róż =

Location
- Country: Poland

Physical characteristics
- Mouth
  - location: Narew
  - coordinates: 52°55′43″N 21°24′48″E
  - elevation: 87.9 m

Basin features
- Progression: Narew→ Vistula→ Baltic Sea

Róż (En:Rose) is a river of Poland, a tributary of the Narew near Młynarze. The river is 30.17 kilometres (18.75 mi) long.

It flows in Maków County . Its source is northwest of the village of Ruzieck , from where it flows to that village and then southeast. It flows through the villages of Pach , Zamość, Sławkowo, and Młynarze. It then flows through Lake Sieluńskie and empties approximately 1 km southeast of the village of Sieluń.

== See also ==
- Narew
- Vistula
