= Piszczaty-Kończany =

- Village
- Location within Poland
- Coordinates: 53°3′22″N 22°36′50″E
- Country: Poland
- Voivodeship: Podlaskie
- County: Wysokie Mazowieckie
- Gmina: Kobylin-Borzymy
- Population: 106

Piszczaty-Kończany [piʂˈt͡ʂatɨ kɔɲˈt͡ʂanɨ] is a village in the administrative district of Gmina Kobylin-Borzymy, within Wysokie Mazowieckie County, Podlaskie Voivodeship, in north-eastern Poland.
