= Sikory-Bartkowięta =

- Village
- Location within Poland
- Coordinates: 53°8′N 22°38′E
- Country: Poland
- Voivodeship: Podlaskie
- County: Wysokie Mazowieckie
- Gmina: Kobylin-Borzymy
- Elevation: 135 m (443 ft)
- Population: 83

Sikory-Bartkowięta [ɕiˈkɔrɨ bartkɔˈvjɛnta] is a village in the administrative district of Gmina Kobylin-Borzymy, within Wysokie Mazowieckie County, Podlaskie Voivodeship, in north-eastern Poland.
