= Wnory-Kużele =

- Village
- Location within Poland
- Coordinates: 53°3′N 22°34′E
- Country: Poland
- Voivodeship: Podlaskie
- County: Wysokie Mazowieckie
- Gmina: Kobylin-Borzymy

Population
  - Total: 140
- Postal code: 18-208
- Vehicle registration: BWM

Wnory-Kużele [ˈvnɔrɨ kuˈʐɛlɛ] is a village in the administrative district of Gmina Kobylin-Borzymy, within Wysokie Mazowieckie County, Podlaskie Voivodeship, in north-eastern Poland.
