= Poredy-Leśniczówka =

- Village
- Location within Poland
- Coordinates: 53°18′30″N 21°48′29″E
- Country: Poland
- Voivodeship: Podlaskie
- County: Łomża
- Gmina: Zbójna

Poredy-Leśniczówka (Polish pronunciation: [pɔˈrɛdɨ lɛɕɲiˈtʂufka]) is a village in the administrative district of Gmina Zbójna, within Łomża County, Podlaskie Voivodeship, in north-eastern Poland.
