= Franki-Dąbrowa =

- Village
- Location within Poland
- Coordinates: 53°5′N 22°42′E
- Country: Poland
- Voivodeship: Podlaskie
- County: Wysokie Mazowieckie
- Gmina: Kobylin-Borzymy

Franki-Dąbrowa [ˈfranki dɔmˈbrɔva] is a village in the administrative district of Gmina Kobylin-Borzymy, within Wysokie Mazowieckie County, Podlaskie Voivodeship, in north-eastern Poland.
