= Kierzki, Podlaskie Voivodeship =

Kierzki
- Village
- Location within Poland
- Coordinates: 53°03′11″N 22°40′06″E
- Country: Poland
- Voivodeship: Podlaskie
- County: Wysokie Mazowieckie
- Gmina: Kobylin-Borzymy

Kierzki [ˈkʲɛʂki] is a village in the administrative district of Gmina Kobylin-Borzymy, within Wysokie Mazowieckie County, Podlaskie Voivodeship, in north-eastern Poland.
