= Sikory-Tomkowięta =

- Village
- Location within Poland
- Coordinates: 53°06′22″N 22°37′40″E
- Country: Poland
- Voivodeship: Podlaskie
- County: Wysokie Mazowieckie
- Gmina: Kobylin-Borzymy
- Time zone: UTC+1 (CET)
  - Summer (DST): UTC+2 (CEST)
- Vehicle registration: BWM

Sikory-Tomkowięta [ɕiˈkɔrɨ tɔmkɔˈvjɛnta] is a village in the administrative district of Gmina Kobylin-Borzymy, within Wysokie Mazowieckie County, Podlaskie Voivodeship, in north-eastern Poland.

== History ==
In 1827, the village had a population of 45.

Following the joint German-Soviet invasion of Poland, which started World War II in September 1939, the village was first occupied by the Soviet Union until 1941, and then by Germany until 1944. On July 13, 1943, in retaliation for the activity of the Polish resistance organization Uderzeniowe Bataliony Kadrowe, the German gendarmerie and SS pacified the village, murdering 49 Poles in two mass executions.

== Transport ==
The Polish S8 highway runs nearby, north of the village.
