= Kłoski-Świgonie =

- Village
- Location within Poland
- Coordinates: 53°03′07″N 22°38′50″E
- Country: Poland
- Voivodeship: Podlaskie
- County: Wysokie Mazowieckie
- Gmina: Kobylin-Borzymy

Kłoski-Świgonie [ˈkwɔski ɕfiˈɡɔɲɛ] is a village in the administrative district of Gmina Kobylin-Borzymy, within Wysokie Mazowieckie County, Podlaskie Voivodeship, in north-eastern Poland.

In the years 1975–1998, the town administratively belonged to the Łomża Province.
