= Sosnowy =

- Village
- Location within Poland
- Coordinates: 53°19′39″N 21°47′49″E
- Country: Poland
- Voivodeship: Podlaskie
- County: Łomża
- Gmina: Zbójna

Sosnowy [sɔsˈnɔvɨ] is a village in the administrative district of Gmina Zbójna, within Łomża County, Podlaskie Voivodeship, in north-eastern Poland.
