= Kłoski-Młynowięta =

Village in Gmina Kobylin-Borzymy, Poland

- Village
- Location within Poland
- Coordinates: 53°02′26″N 22°38′17″E
- Country: Poland
- Voivodeship: Podlaskie
- County: Wysokie Mazowieckie
- Gmina: Kobylin-Borzymy

Kłoski-Młynowięta [ˈkwɔski mwɨnɔˈvjɛnta] is a village in the administrative district of Gmina Kobylin-Borzymy, within Wysokie Mazowieckie County, Podlaskie Voivodeship, in north-eastern Poland.
