= Kropiwnica-Racibory =

- Village
- Location within Poland
- Coordinates: 53°04′49″N 22°43′39″E
- Country: Poland
- Voivodeship: Podlaskie
- County: Wysokie Mazowieckie
- Gmina: Kobylin-Borzymy

Kropiwnica-Racibory [krɔpivˈnit͡sa rat͡ɕiˈbɔrɨ] is a village in the administrative district of Gmina Kobylin-Borzymy, within Wysokie Mazowieckie County, Podlaskie Voivodeship, in north-eastern Poland.
