= Kurowo-Kolonia, Podlaskie Voivodeship =

Kurowo-Kolonia
- Village
- Location within Poland
- Coordinates: 53°06′26″N 22°46′10″E
- Country: Poland
- Voivodeship: Podlaskie
- County: Wysokie Mazowieckie
- Gmina: Kobylin-Borzymy

Kurowo-Kolonia [kuˈrɔvɔ kɔˈlɔɲa] is a village in the administrative district of Gmina Kobylin-Borzymy, within Wysokie Mazowieckie County, Podlaskie Voivodeship, in north-eastern Poland.
