= Stypułki-Święchy =

- Village
- Location within Poland
- Coordinates: 53°03′12″N 22°38′06″E
- Country: Poland
- Voivodeship: Podlaskie
- County: Wysokie Mazowieckie
- Gmina: Kobylin-Borzymy

Stypułki-Święchy (Polish pronunciation: [stɨˈpuwkʲi ˈɕfjɛ̃xɨ]) is a village in the administrative district of Gmina Kobylin-Borzymy, within Wysokie Mazowieckie County, Podlaskie Voivodeship, in north-eastern Poland.
