= Zalesie Łabędzkie =

- Village
- Location within Poland
- Coordinates: 53°6′N 22°38′E
- Country: Poland
- Voivodeship: Podlaskie
- County: Wysokie Mazowieckie
- Gmina: Kobylin-Borzymy

Zalesie Łabędzkie [zaˈlɛɕɛ waˈbɛnt͡skʲɛ] is a village in the administrative district of Gmina Kobylin-Borzymy, within Wysokie Mazowieckie County, Podlaskie Voivodeship, in north-eastern Poland.
