= Nowogród, Gmina Zbójna =

Nowogród
- Village
- Location within Poland
- Coordinates: 53°14′19″N 21°42′59″E
- Country: Poland
- Voivodeship: Podlaskie
- County: Łomża
- Gmina: Zbójna

Nowogród [nɔˈvɔɡrut] is a village in the administrative district of Gmina Zbójna, within Łomża County, Podlaskie Voivodeship, in north-eastern Poland.
