= Nowe Garbowo =

- Village
- Location within Poland
- Coordinates: 53°05′10″N 22°37′39″E
- Country: Poland
- Voivodeship: Podlaskie
- County: Wysokie Mazowieckie
- Gmina: Kobylin-Borzymy

Nowe Garbowo [ˈnɔvɛ ɡarˈbɔvɔ] is a village in the administrative district of Gmina Kobylin-Borzymy, within Wysokie Mazowieckie County, Podlaskie Voivodeship, in north-eastern Poland.
