= Stypułki-Borki =

- Village
- Location within Poland
- Coordinates: 53°01′31″N 22°38′36″E
- Country: Poland
- Voivodeship: Podlaskie
- County: Wysokie Mazowieckie
- Gmina: Kobylin-Borzymy

Stypułki-Borki (Polish pronunciation: [stɨˈpuwkʲi ˈbɔrkʲi]) is a village in the administrative district of Gmina Kobylin-Borzymy, within Wysokie Mazowieckie County, Podlaskie Voivodeship, in north-eastern Poland.
