= Tabory-Rzym =

- Village
- Location within Poland
- Coordinates: 53°13′N 21°46′E
- Country: Poland
- Voivodeship: Podlaskie
- County: Łomża
- Gmina: Zbójna

Tabory-Rzym [taˈbɔrɨ ˈʐɨm] is a village in the administrative district of Gmina Zbójna, within Łomża County, Podlaskie Voivodeship, in north-eastern Poland. The elevation is 97 meters above sea level.
