= Sikory-Pawłowięta =

- Village
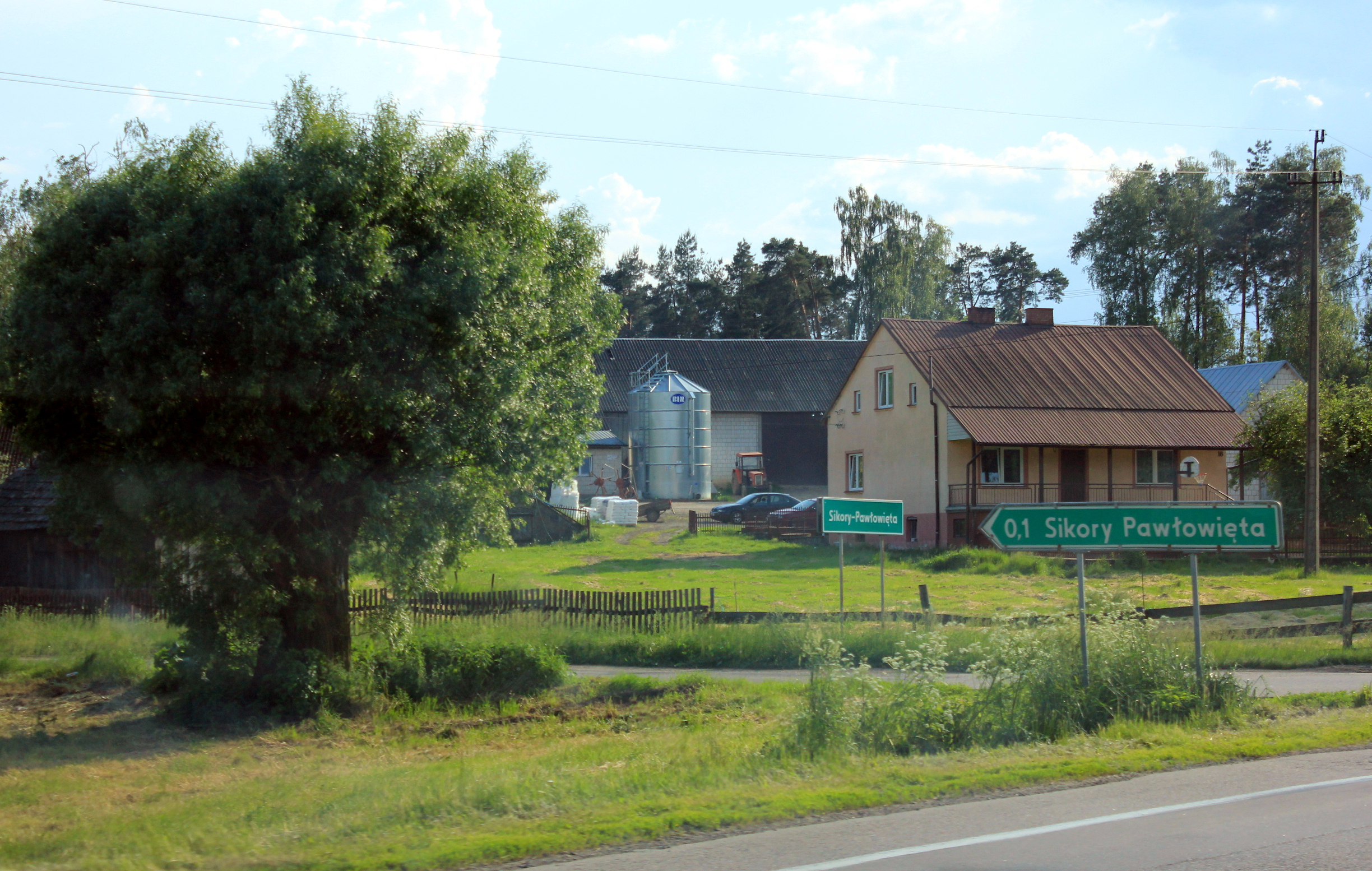

- Location within Poland
- Coordinates: 53°06′41″N 22°37′36″E
- Country: Poland
- Voivodeship: Podlaskie
- County: Wysokie Mazowieckie
- Gmina: Kobylin-Borzymy

Sikory-Pawłowięta [ɕiˈkɔrɨ pavwɔˈvjɛnta] is a village in the administrative district of Gmina Kobylin-Borzymy, within Wysokie Mazowieckie County, Podlaskie Voivodeship, in north-eastern Poland.
