= Orlanka =

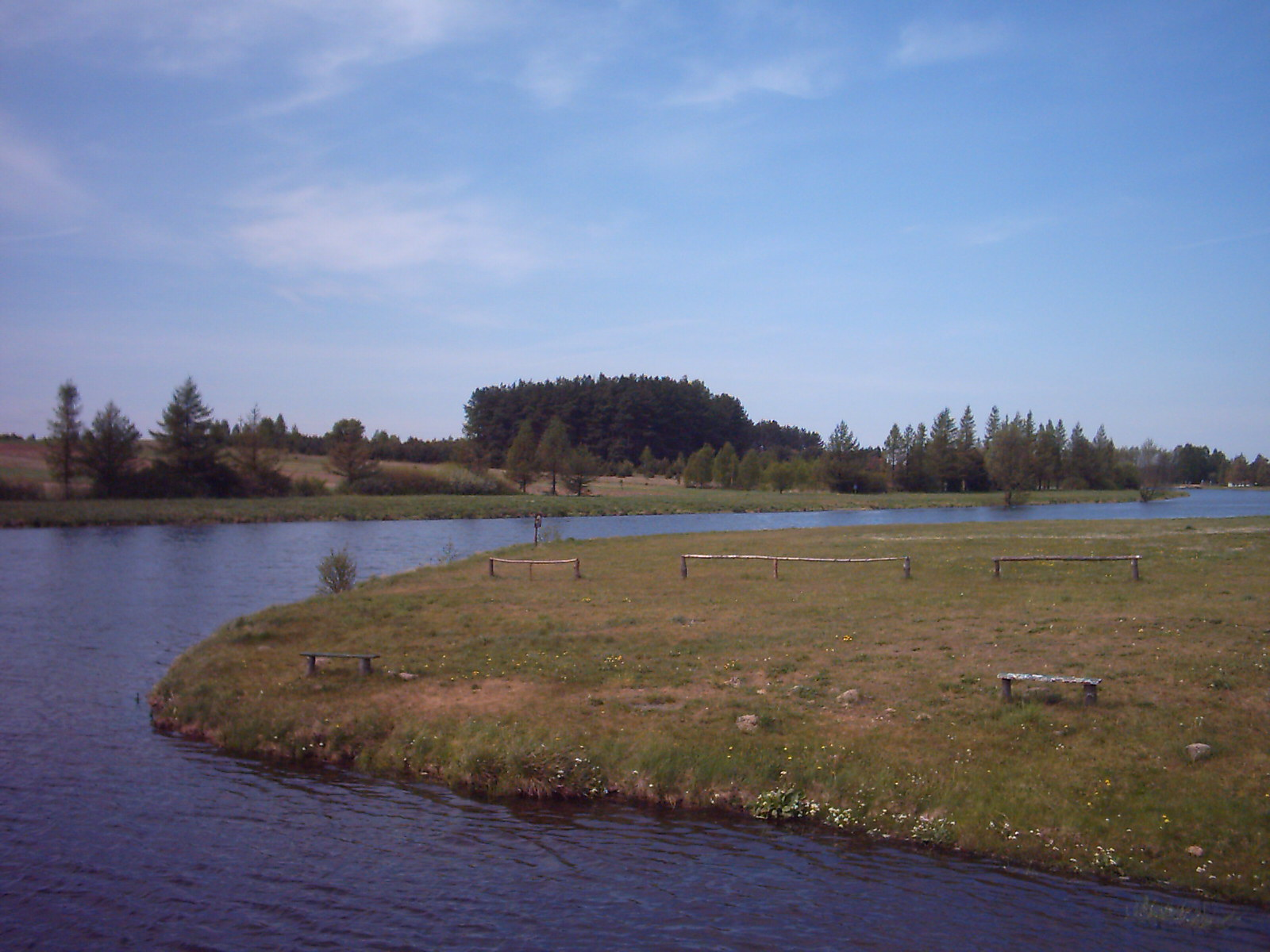

Location
- Country: Poland

Physical characteristics
- Source
  - location: Poland
- Mouth
  - location: near Czerewki on the Narew
  - coordinates: 52°54′38″N 23°09′03″E

Basin features
- Progression: Narew→ Vistula→ Baltic Sea

The Orlanka or Orlanka River, in eastern Poland, is a tributary of the Narew River.

== Geography ==
The Orlanka flows through the geographical region of Europe known as the Wysoczyzny Podlasko – Białoruskie (English: Podlaskie and Belarus Plateau) located in the Podlaskie Voivodeship of Poland.

The drainage area is contained within the mezoregion known as the Równina Bielska (English: Bielsk Plain).

== Tributaries ==
Left Bank	Right Bank	Municipality	Characteristics
		Zbucz	Source
Biała		Sobótka	
		Czerewki	Mouth at the Narew
