= Stanisławowo, Łomża County =

Stanisławowo
- Village
- Location within Poland
- Coordinates: 53°11′23″N 21°41′35″E
- Country: Poland
- Voivodeship: Podlaskie
- County: Łomża
- Gmina: Zbójna

Stanisławowo [staniswaˈvɔvɔ] is a village in the administrative district of Gmina Zbójna, within Łomża County, Podlaskie Voivodeship, in north-eastern Poland.
