= Franki-Piaski =

- Village
- Location within Poland
- Coordinates: 53°04′22″N 22°39′00″E
- Country: Poland
- Voivodeship: Podlaskie
- County: Wysokie Mazowieckie
- Gmina: Kobylin-Borzymy

Franki-Piaski (Polish pronunciation: [ˈfraŋkʲi ˈpjaskʲi]) is a village in the administrative district of Gmina Kobylin-Borzymy, within Wysokie Mazowieckie County, Podlaskie Voivodeship, in north-eastern Poland.

== History ==
In 1827 the village comprised 10 houses and contained 48 inhabitants.
