= Piasutno Żelazne-Leśniczówka =

- Village
- Location within Poland
- Coordinates: 53°17′39″N 21°52′09″E
- Country: Poland
- Voivodeship: Podlaskie
- County: Łomża
- Gmina: Zbójna

Piasutno Żelazne-Leśniczówka (Polish pronunciation: [pjaˈsutnɔ ʐɛˈlaznɛ lɛɕɲiˈtʂufka]) is a village in the administrative district of Gmina Zbójna, within Łomża County, Podlaskie Voivodeship, in north-eastern Poland.
