= Stare Wnory =

- Village
- Location within Poland
- Coordinates: 53°3′N 22°34′E
- Country: Poland
- Voivodeship: Podlaskie
- County: Wysokie Mazowieckie
- Gmina: Kobylin-Borzymy

Population
  - Total: 260
- Postal code: 18-208
- Vehicle registration: BWM

Stare Wnory [ˈstarɛ ˈvnɔrɨ] is a village in the administrative district of Gmina Kobylin-Borzymy, within Wysokie Mazowieckie County, Podlaskie Voivodeship, in north-eastern Poland.

Five Polish citizens were murdered by Nazi Germany in the village during World War II.
