= Piasutno Żelazne =

- Village
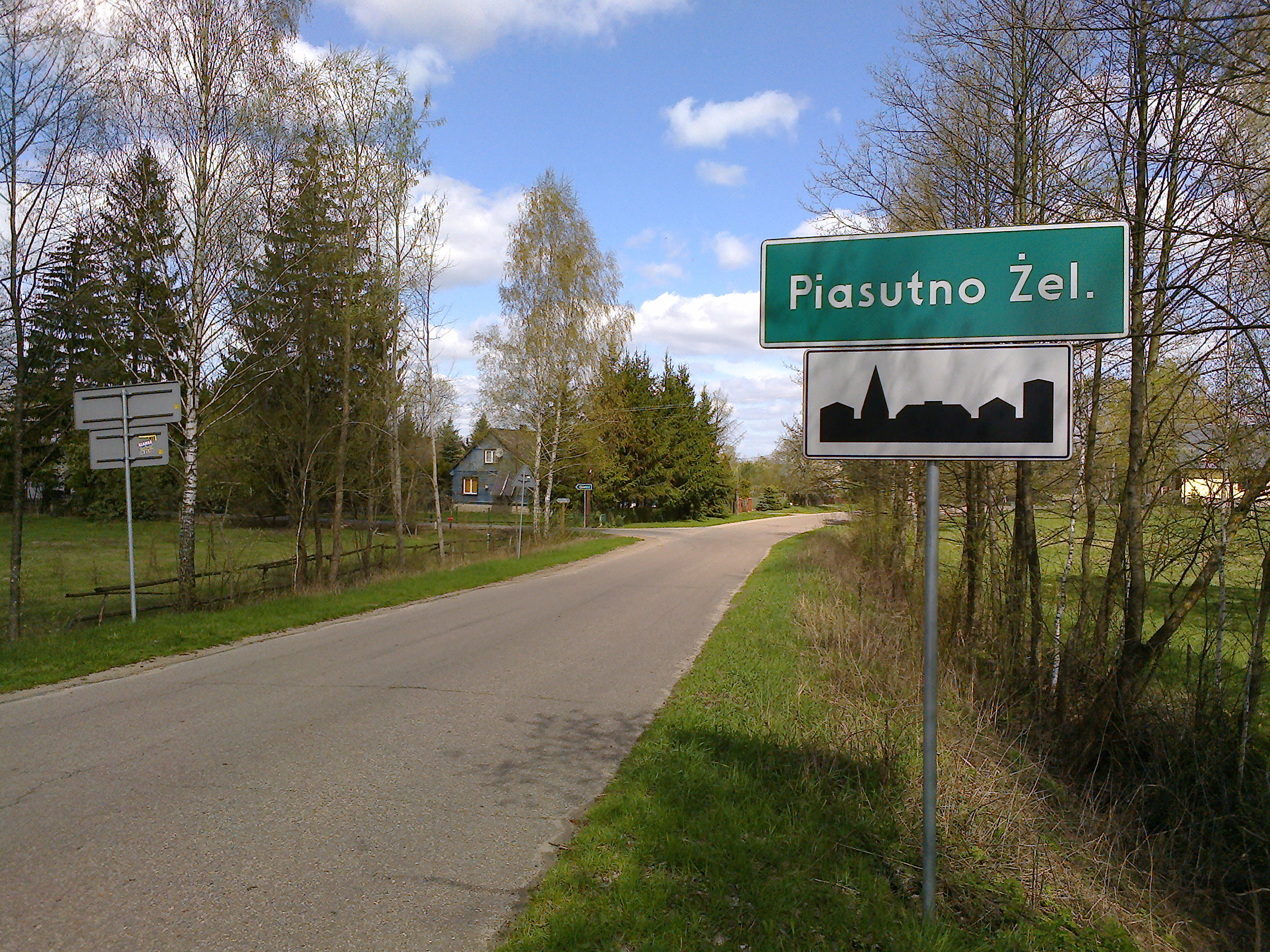
- Road sign in Piasutno Żelazne

- Location within Poland
- Coordinates: 53°17′34″N 21°52′02″E
- Country: Poland
- Voivodeship: Podlaskie
- County: Łomża
- Gmina: Zbójna

Piasutno Żelazne [pjaˈsutnɔ ʐɛˈlaznɛ] is a village in the administrative district of Gmina Zbójna, within Łomża County, Podlaskie Voivodeship, in north-eastern Poland.
