= Mojki =

- Village
- Location within Poland
- Coordinates: 53°3′N 22°39′E
- Country: Poland
- Voivodeship: Podlaskie
- County: Wysokie Mazowieckie
- Gmina: Kobylin-Borzymy
- Population: 50

Mojki [ˈmɔi̯ki] is a village in the administrative district of Gmina Kobylin-Borzymy, within Wysokie Mazowieckie County, Podlaskie Voivodeship, in north-eastern Poland.
