= Jagłowiec =

Village in Gmina Zbójna, Poland

- Village
- Location within Poland
- Coordinates: 53°11′19″N 21°43′29″E
- Country: Poland
- Voivodeship: Podlaskie
- County: Łomża
- Gmina: Zbójna

Jagłowiec [jaˈɡwɔvjɛt͡s] is a village in the administrative district of Gmina Zbójna, within Łomża County, Podlaskie Voivodeship, in north-eastern Poland.
