= Popiołki, Łomża County =

Village in Gmina Zbójna, Poland

Popiołki
- Village
- Location within Poland
- Coordinates: 53°17′56″N 21°42′00″E
- Country: Poland
- Voivodeship: Podlaskie
- County: Łomża
- Gmina: Zbójna

Popiołki [pɔˈpjɔu̯ki] is a village in the administrative district of Gmina Zbójna, within Łomża County, Podlaskie Voivodeship, in north-eastern Poland.
