= Sikory-Wojciechowięta =

- Village
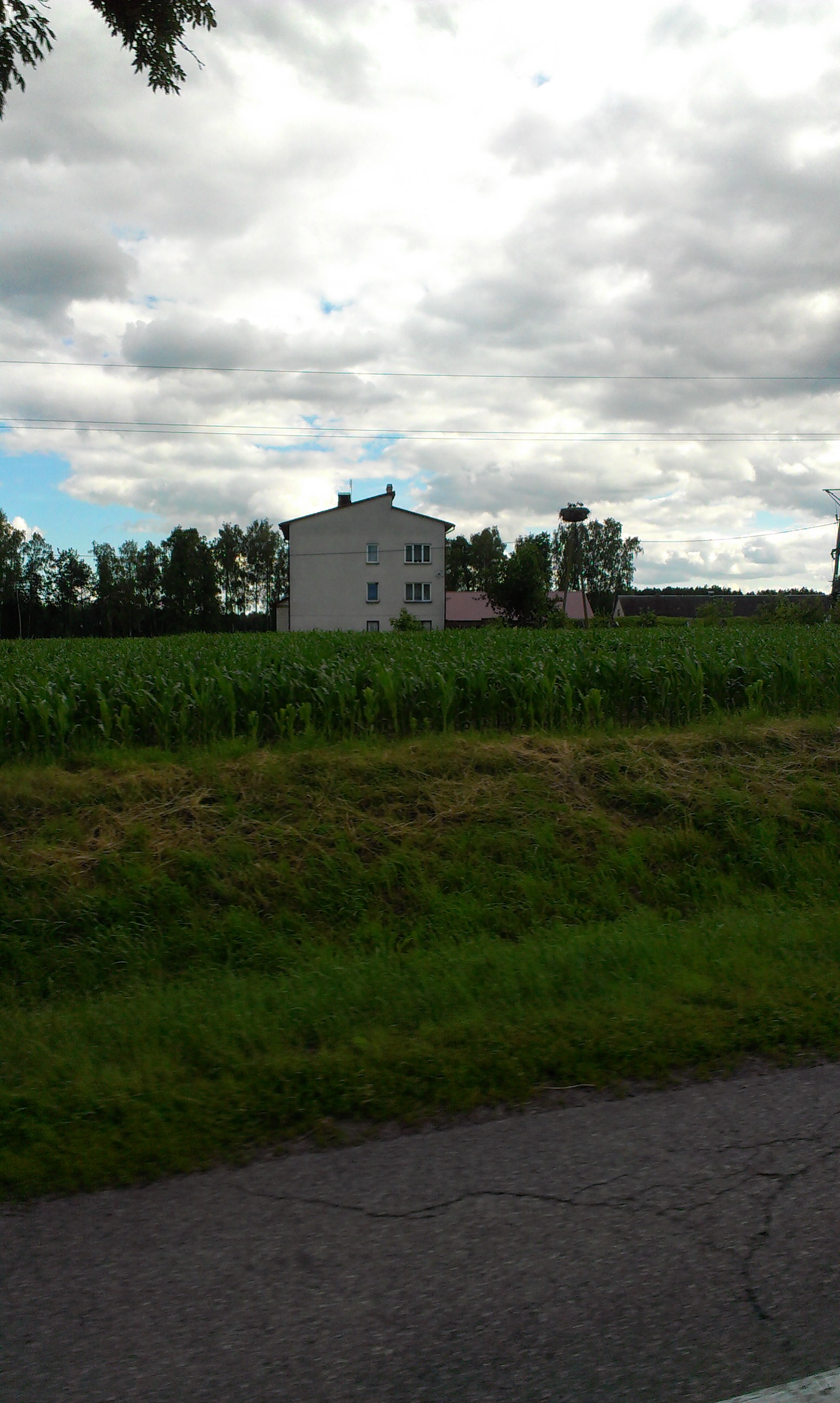
- A picture of a part of Sikory-Wojciechowięta

- Location within Poland
- Coordinates: 53°07′25″N 22°37′55″E
- Country: Poland
- Voivodeship: Podlaskie
- County: Wysokie Mazowieckie
- Gmina: Kobylin-Borzymy

Sikory-Wojciechowięta (Polish pronunciation: [ɕiˈkɔrɨ vɔjt͡ɕɛxɔˈvjɛnta]) is a village in the administrative district of Gmina Kobylin-Borzymy, within Wysokie Mazowieckie County, Podlaskie Voivodeship, in north-eastern Poland.
