= Piszczaty-Piotrowięta =

- Village
- Location within Poland
- Coordinates: 53°03′21″N 22°37′27″E
- Country: Poland
- Voivodeship: Podlaskie
- County: Wysokie Mazowieckie
- Gmina: Kobylin-Borzymy

Piszczaty-Piotrowięta [piʂˈt͡ʂatɨ pjɔtrɔˈvjɛnta] is a village in the administrative district of Gmina Kobylin-Borzymy, within Wysokie Mazowieckie County, Podlaskie Voivodeship, in north-eastern Poland.
