= Dobry Las =

- Village
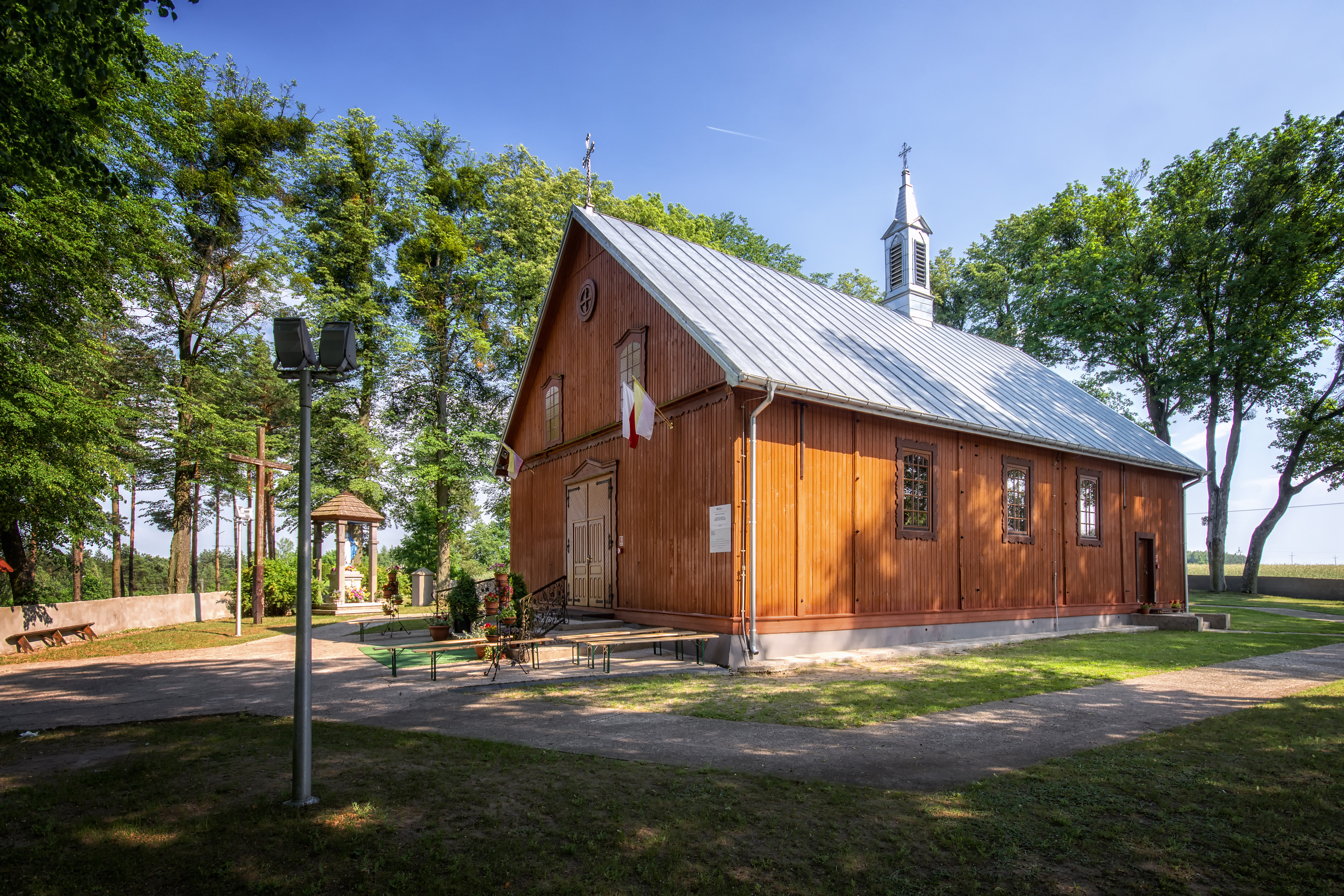
- Sacred Heart church in Dobry Las

- Location within Poland
- Coordinates: 53°17′N 21°51′E
- Country: Poland
- Voivodeship: Podlaskie
- County: Łomża
- Gmina: Zbójna

Population
  - Total: 380 (as of 2,021)
- Time zone: UTC+1 (CET)
  - Summer (DST): UTC+2 (CEST)

Dobry Las [ˈdɔbrɨ ˈlas] is a village in the administrative district of Gmina Zbójna, within Łomża County, Podlaskie Voivodeship, in north-eastern Poland.

== History ==
Three Polish citizens were murdered by Nazi Germany in the village during World War II.
