= Gmina Kobylin-Borzymy =

Gmina Kobylin-Borzymy Kobylin-Borzymy Commune
- Gmina
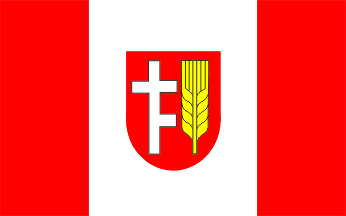
- Flag Coat of arms
- Interactive map of Gmina Kobylin-Borzymy
- Coordinates (Kobylin-Borzymy): 53°5′N 22°40′E
- Country: Poland
- Voivodeship: Podlaskie
- County: Wysokie Mazowieckie
- Seat: Kobylin-Borzymy

Area
  - Total: 119.4 km^{2} (46.1 sq mi)

Population (2024)
  - Total: 2,918
  - Density: 24.44/km^{2} (63.30/sq mi)

Gmina Kobylin-Borzymy is a rural gmina (administrative district) in Wysokie Mazowieckie County, Podlaskie Voivodeship, in north-eastern Poland. Its seat is the village of Kobylin-Borzymy, which lies approximately 21 kilometres (13 mi) north-east of Wysokie Mazowieckie and 34 km (21 mi) west of the regional capital Białystok.

The gmina covers an area of 119.4 square kilometres (46.1 sq mi), and had a population of 2,918 as of 2024. A small part of the gmina, about 300 hectares (740 acres), lies within Narew National Park, whose administration is based at Kurowo within the gmina. The gmina is of a typically agricultural nature - the terrain is favorable for the cultivation of useful plants and individual farms dominate the agricultural activity.

== History ==
Many of the villages of the gmina belong to a cluster sharing the name Kobylin (historically Kobylino). According to the Słownik geograficzny Królestwa Polskiego, petty nobility from Mazovia started settling in the area in the 14th century. They founded eight hamlets in the 15th century, each later known by a second name corresponding to a family or landholder. A parish church was founded in Kobylin-Borzymy at the start of the 15th century. In 1775 the Kobylin villages had 122 households, and by 1827 the number had increased to 135. The Słownik also records that Kobylin was among the oldest settlements in Podlasie, as shown by flint sites discovered by Zygmunt Gloger and many primitive querns found in the area.

Before 1954 the Kobylin villages were part of the gmina of Kobylin. Under the 1954 administrative reform, 12 gromadas of that gmina, including Kobylin-Borzymy, Kobylin-Latki, Kobylin-Pieniążki and Makowo, were merged into a single new gromada of Kobylin-Borzymy. The current Gmina Kobylin-Borzymy was created by Resolution No. XXI/72/72 of the Voivodeship National Council in Białystok of 9 December 1972, comprising 40 sołectwa.

== Villages ==
Gmina Kobylin-Borzymy contains the villages and settlements of:

- Franki-Dąbrowa
- Franki-Piaski
- Garbowo-Kolonia
- Kierzki
- Kłoski-Młynowięta
- Kłoski-Świgonie
- Kobylin-Borzymy
- Kobylin-Cieszymy
- Kobylin-Kruszewo
- Kobylin-Kuleszki
- Kobylin-Latki
- Kobylin-Pieniążki
- Kobylin-Pogorzałki
- Kropiwnica-Gajki
- Kropiwnica-Racibory
- Kurowo
- Kurowo-Kolonia
- Kurzyny
- Makowo
- Milewo Zabielne
- Mojki
- Nowe Garbowo
- Piszczaty-Kończany
- Piszczaty-Piotrowięta
- Pszczółczyn
- Sikory-Bartkowięta
- Sikory-Bartyczki
- Sikory-Janowięta
- Sikory-Pawłowięta
- Sikory-Piotrowięta
- Sikory-Tomkowięta
- Sikory-Wojciechowięta
- Stare Wnory
- Stypułki-Borki
- Stypułki-Święchy
- Stypułki-Szymany
- Wnory-Kużele
- Wnory-Wandy
- Zalesie Łabędzkie

== Neighbouring gminas ==
Gmina Kobylin-Borzymy is bordered by the gminas of Choroszcz, Kulesze Kościelne, Rutki, Sokoły, Tykocin and Zawady.
