= Gmina Zbójna =

Gmina Zbójna Zbójna Commune
- Gmina
- Gmina Zbójna within the Łomża County
- Coordinates (Zbójna): 53°15′N 21°48′E
- Country: Poland
- Voivodeship: Podlaskie
- County: Łomża County
- Seat: Zbójna

Area
  - Total: 185.77 km^{2} (71.73 sq mi)

Population (2011)
  - Total: 4,424
  - Density: 23.81/km^{2} (61.68/sq mi)
- Website: http://www.zbojna.powiatlomzynski.pl

Gmina Zbójna is a rural gmina (administrative district) in Łomża County, Podlaskie Voivodeship, in north-eastern Poland. Its seat is the village of Zbójna, which is approximately 22 kilometres (14 mi) north-west of Łomża and 93 km (58 mi) west of the regional capital Białystok.

The gmina covers an area of 185.77 square kilometres (71.7 sq mi), and as of 2006 its total population is 4,339 (4,424 in 2011).

== Villages ==
Gmina Zbójna contains the villages and settlements of Bienduszka, Dębniki, Dobry Las, Dobry Las-Leśniczówka, Gawrychy, Gontarze, Jagłowiec, Jurki, Kuzie, Laski, Nowogród, Osowiec, Osowiec-Leśniczówka, Pianki, Piasutno Żelazne, Piasutno Żelazne-Leśniczówka, Popiołki, Poredy, Poredy-Leśniczówka, Ruda Osowiecka, Siwiki, Sosnowy, Stanisławowo, Tabory-Rzym, Wyk and Zbójna.

== Neighbouring gminas ==
Gmina Zbójna is bordered by the gminas of Kadzidło, Kolno, Lelis, Łyse, Mały Płock, Miastkowo, Nowogród and Turośl.
