= Osowiec-Leśniczówka =

- Village
- Location within Poland
- Coordinates: 53°12′49″N 21°43′39″E
- Country: Poland
- Voivodeship: Podlaskie
- County: Łomża
- Gmina: Zbójna

Osowiec-Leśniczówka (Polish pronunciation: [ɔˈsɔvjɛts lɛɕɲiˈtʂufka]) is a village in the administrative district of Gmina Zbójna, within Łomża County, Podlaskie Voivodeship, in north-eastern Poland.
