= Dębniki, Łomża County =

Dębniki
- Village
- Location within Poland
- Coordinates: 53°14′N 21°50′E
- Country: Poland
- Voivodeship: Podlaskie
- County: Łomża
- Gmina: Zbójna

Dębniki [dɛmbˈniki] is a village in the administrative district of Gmina Zbójna, within Łomża County, Podlaskie Voivodeship, in north-eastern Poland.
