= Białaszewo =

- Village
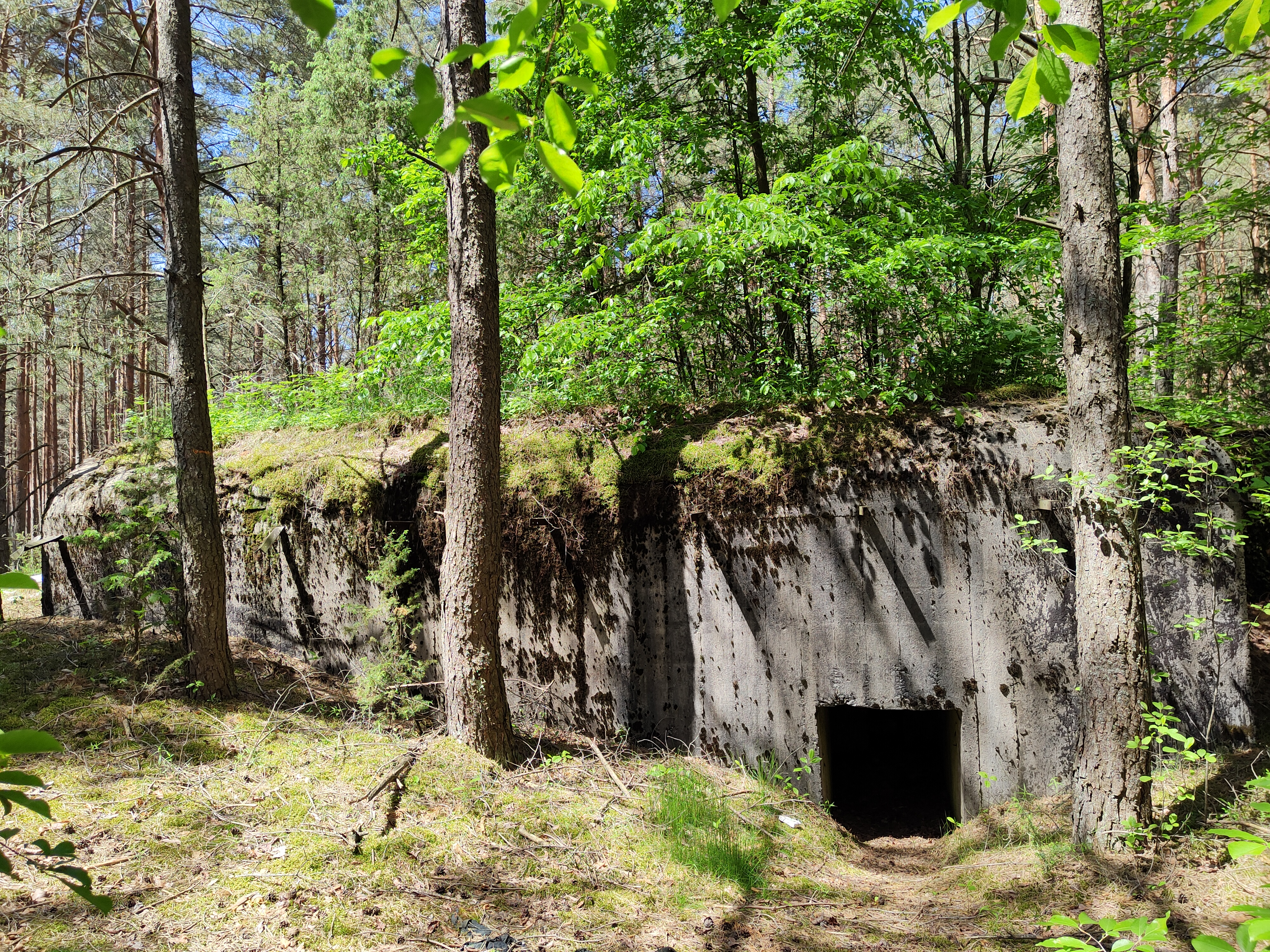
- World War II bunker in Białaszewo

- Location within Poland
- Coordinates: 53°31′N 22°31′E
- Country: Poland
- Voivodeship: Podlaskie
- County: Grajewo
- Gmina: Grajewo
- Time zone: UTC+1 (CET)
  - Summer (DST): UTC+2 (CEST)
- Vehicle registration: BGR

Białaszewo [bjawaˈʂɛvɔ] is a village in the administrative district of Gmina Grajewo, within Grajewo County, Podlaskie Voivodeship, in north-eastern Poland.

== History ==
Białaszewo was a private village of Polish nobility, administratively located in the Masovian Voivodeship in the Greater Poland Province of the Kingdom of Poland. In 1709, a church was erected by Seweryn Szczuka, suffragan bishop of Chełm.

Following the Third Partition of Poland (1795), Białaszewo was annexed by the Prussia. In 1807 it was regained by Poles, and included within the newly established, however short-lived Duchy of Warsaw. Following the duchy's dissolution in 1815, it fell to the Russian Partition of Poland. In 1827 Białaszewo had a population of 121. During the January Uprising, on March 31, 1863, it was the site of a battle between Polish insurgents and Russian troops, during which the Poles were able to retreat with only two casualties. In reprisal, the Russians carried out a massacre of the inhabitants. At least 16 people were killed, including women. After World War I, Poland regained independence and control of the village.

Following the German-Soviet invasion of Poland, which started World War II in September 1939, was occupied by the Soviet Union until 1941 and then by Nazi Germany until 1944. The local police chief was murdered by the Russians in the Katyn massacre in 1940.

Afterwards, the village was restored to Poland, although with a Soviet-installed communist regime, which stayed in power until the Fall of Communism in the 1980s. The Polish anti-communist resistance was active in Białaszewo, and in 1945 it raided a local communist police station.

== Sights ==
There are graves of the fallen insurgents of the January Uprising and the victims of the Russian-perpetrated massacre of 1863, and three World War II bunkers in Białaszewo.
