= Gawrychy =

- Village
- Location within Poland
- Coordinates: 53°17′N 21°44′E
- Country: Poland
- Voivodeship: Podlaskie
- County: Łomża
- Gmina: Zbójna

Gawrychy [ɡaˈvrɨxɨ] is a village in the administrative district of Gmina Zbójna, within Łomża County, Podlaskie Voivodeship, in north-eastern Poland.
