= Kanyuki =

Kanyuki Канюки
- Village
- Location within Perm Krai Location within Russia
- Coordinates: 58°46′N 57°08′E
- Country: Russia
- Region: Perm Krai
- District: Dobryansky District
- Time zone: UTC+5:00

Kanyuki (Russian: Канюки) is a rural locality (a village) in Dobryansky District, Perm Krai, Russia. The population was 7 as of 2010.

== Geography ==
Kanyuki is located 90 km northeast of Dobryanka (the district's administrative centre) by road. Tikhaya is the nearest rural locality.
