= Kobylin-Pogorzałki =

Village in Gmina Kobylin-Borzymy, Poland

- Village
- Location within Poland
- Coordinates: 53°07′14″N 22°42′59″E
- Country: Poland
- Voivodeship: Podlaskie
- County: Wysokie Mazowieckie
- Gmina: Kobylin-Borzymy

Kobylin-Pogorzałki [kɔˈbɨlin pɔɡɔˈʐau̯ki] is a village in the administrative district of Gmina Kobylin-Borzymy, within Wysokie Mazowieckie County, Podlaskie Voivodeship, in north-eastern Poland.
