= Uhowo =

- Village
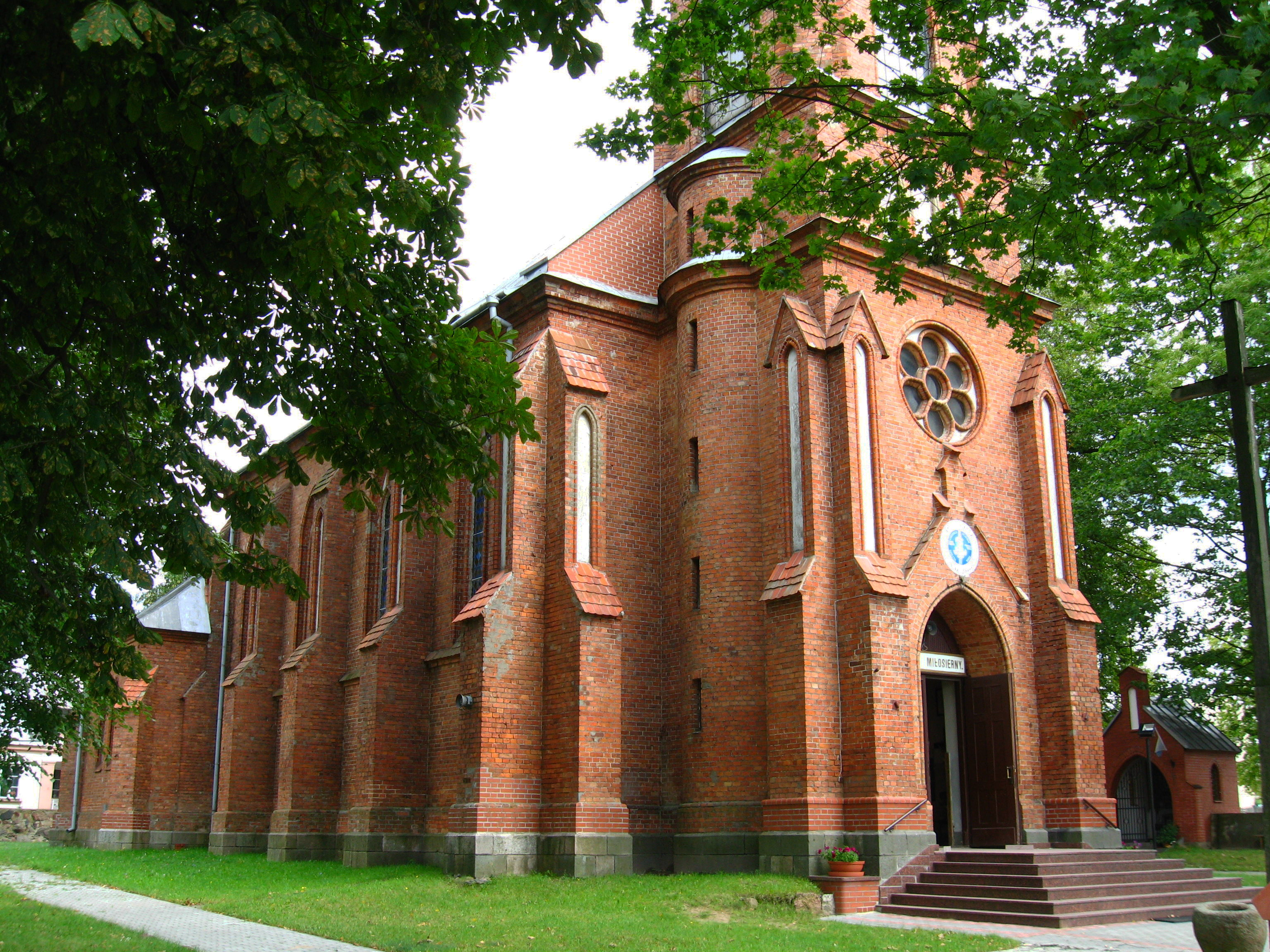
- Church of Saint Adalbert

- Location within Poland
- Coordinates: 53°1′N 22°55′E
- Country: Poland
- Voivodeship: Podlaskie
- County: Białystok
- Gmina: Łapy

Population
  - Total: 1,500
- Website: http://www.uhowo.pl

Uhowo [uˈxɔvɔ] is a village in the administrative district of Gmina Łapy, within Białystok County, Podlaskie Voivodeship, in north-eastern Poland. Uhowo lies on the Narew River.
