= Ostrykół Dworski =

- Village
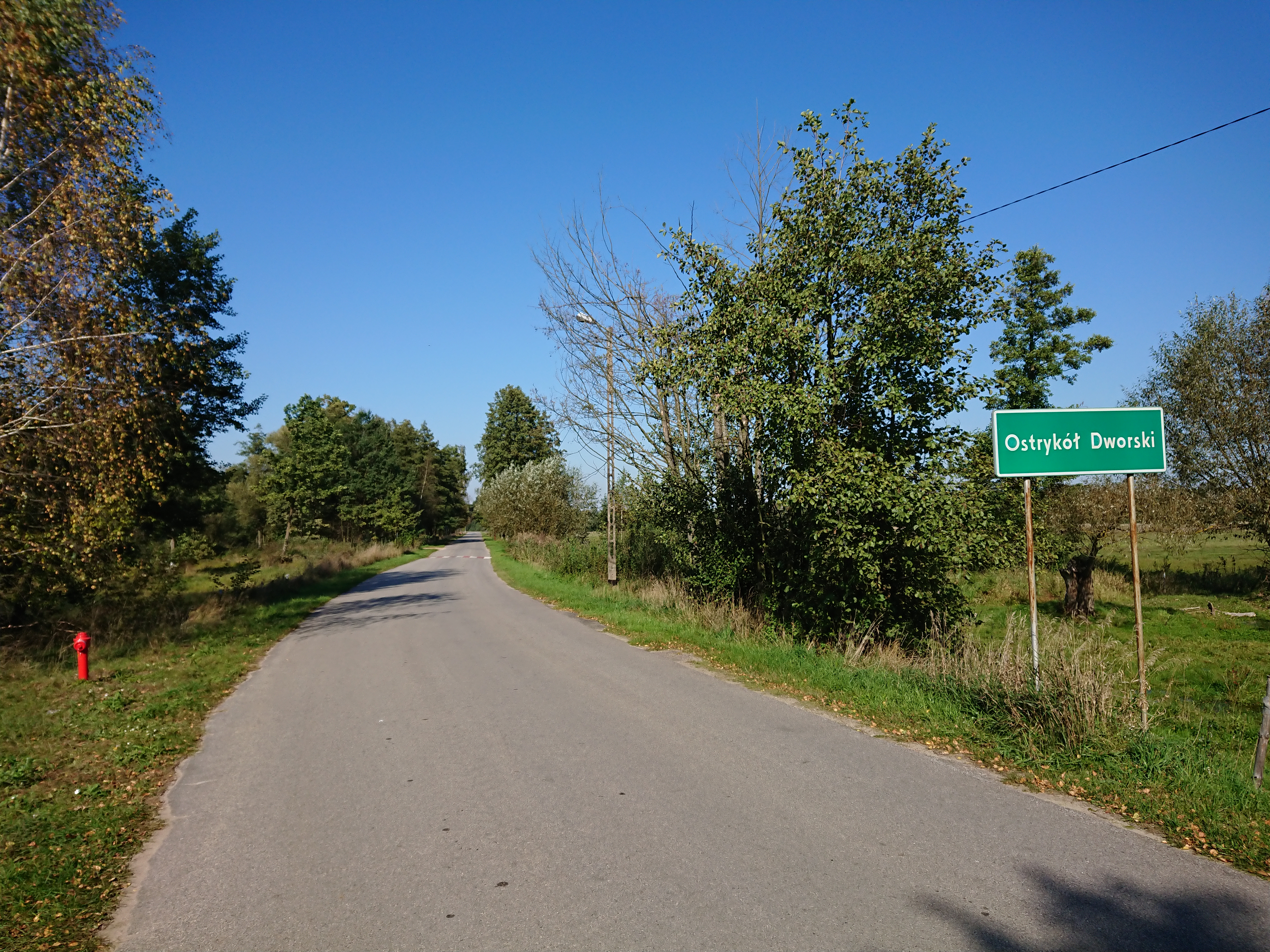
- Entrance to Ostrykół Dworski village, Długosiodło, Poland

- Location within Poland
- Coordinates: 52°47′30″N 21°28′26″E
- Country: Poland
- Voivodeship: Masovian
- County: Wyszków
- Gmina: Długosiodło

Ostrykół Dworski (Polish pronunciation: [ɔsˈtrɨkuw ˈdvɔrskʲi]) is a village in the administrative district of Gmina Długosiodło, within Wyszków County, Masovian Voivodeship, in east-central Poland.
