= Kobylin (surname) =

Kobylin (Russian: Кобылин, from кобыла meaning mare) is a Russian masculine surname, its feminine counterpart is Kobylina. It may refer to

- Aleksandr Sukhovo-Kobylin (1817–1903), Russian nobleman and amateur playwright
- Feodor Koshka, born Feodor Andreevich Kobylin, died 1407, Russian nobleman
- Sofia Sukhovo-Kobylina (1825–1867), Russian painter
