= Nowosiedliny =

- Village
- Location within Poland
- Coordinates: 53°9′N 21°43′E
- Country: Poland
- Voivodeship: Podlaskie
- County: Łomża
- Gmina: Miastkowo

Nowosiedliny [nɔvɔɕɛdˈlinɨ] is a village in the administrative district of Gmina Miastkowo, within Łomża County, Podlaskie Voivodeship, in north-eastern Poland.
