= Kurowo, Podlaskie Voivodeship =

Kurowo
- Village
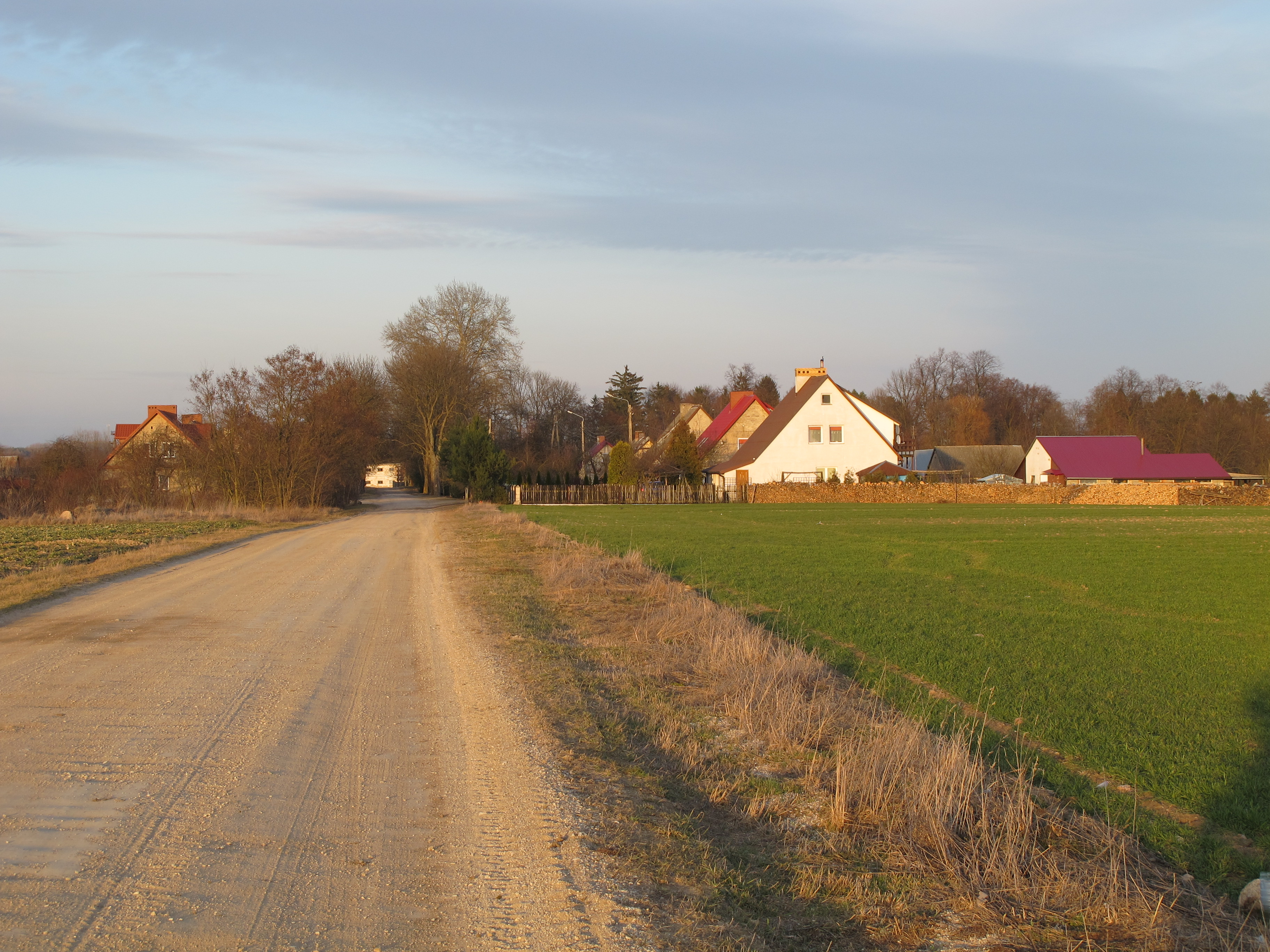
- Kurowo

- Location within Poland
- Coordinates: 53°06′26″N 22°46′10″E
- Country: Poland
- Voivodeship: Podlaskie
- County: Wysokie Mazowieckie
- Gmina: Kobylin-Borzymy

Kurowo [kuˈrɔvɔ] is a village in the administrative district of Gmina Kobylin-Borzymy, within Wysokie Mazowieckie County, Podlaskie Voivodeship, in north-eastern Poland.

It is the seat of the Narew National Park.
