= Topolina =

- Village
- Location within Poland
- Coordinates: 52°29′N 20°52′E
- Country: Poland
- Voivodeship: Masovian
- County: Legionowo
- Gmina: Wieliszew

Topolina [tɔpɔˈlina] is a village in the administrative district of Gmina Wieliszew, within Legionowo County, Masovian Voivodeship, in east-central Poland.

It is named after the poplar tree (topola in Polish) of which there are a great many in the area.
