= Zbójna =

- Village
- Location within Poland
- Coordinates: 53°15′N 21°48′E
- Country: Poland
- Voivodeship: Podlaskie
- County: Łomża
- Gmina: Zbójna

Zbójna [ˈzbui̯na] is a village in Łomża County, Podlaskie Voivodeship, in north-eastern Poland. It is the seat of the gmina (administrative district) called Gmina Zbójna.
