= Gontarze =

- Village
- Location within Poland
- Coordinates: 53°12′N 21°44′E
- Country: Poland
- Voivodeship: Podlaskie
- County: Łomża
- Gmina: Zbójna

Gontarze [ɡɔnˈtaʐɛ] is a village in the administrative district of Gmina Zbójna, within Łomża County, Podlaskie Voivodeship, in north-eastern Poland.

== History ==
According to the General Population Census of 1921, 126 people lived here in 19 residential buildings. The town belonged to the Roman Catholic parish in Zbójna. It was subordinated to the Town Court in Kolno and the District Court in Łomża; the proper post office was in Zbójna.
