= Strabla =

- Village
- Location within Poland
- Coordinates: 52°54′16″N 23°6′49″E
- Country: Poland
- Voivodeship: Podlaskie
- County: Bielsk
- Gmina: Wyszki
- Population (approx.): 600

Strabla [ˈstrabla] is a village in the administrative district of Gmina Wyszki, within Bielsk County, Podlaskie Voivodeship, in north-eastern Poland.

According to the 1921 census, the village was inhabited by 113 people, among whom 71 were Roman Catholic, 41 Orthodox, and 1 Mosaic. At the same time, 87 inhabitants declared Polish nationality, 26 Belarusian. There were 15 residential buildings in the village.
