= Kobylin-Kuleszki =

- Village
- Location within Poland
- Coordinates: 53°05′34″N 22°39′38″E
- Country: Poland
- Voivodeship: Podlaskie
- County: Wysokie Mazowieckie
- Gmina: Kobylin-Borzymy

Kobylin-Kuleszki [kɔˈbɨlin kuˈlɛʂki] is a village in the administrative district of Gmina Kobylin-Borzymy, within Wysokie Mazowieckie County, Podlaskie Voivodeship, in north-eastern Poland.
