= Rzędziany =

- Village
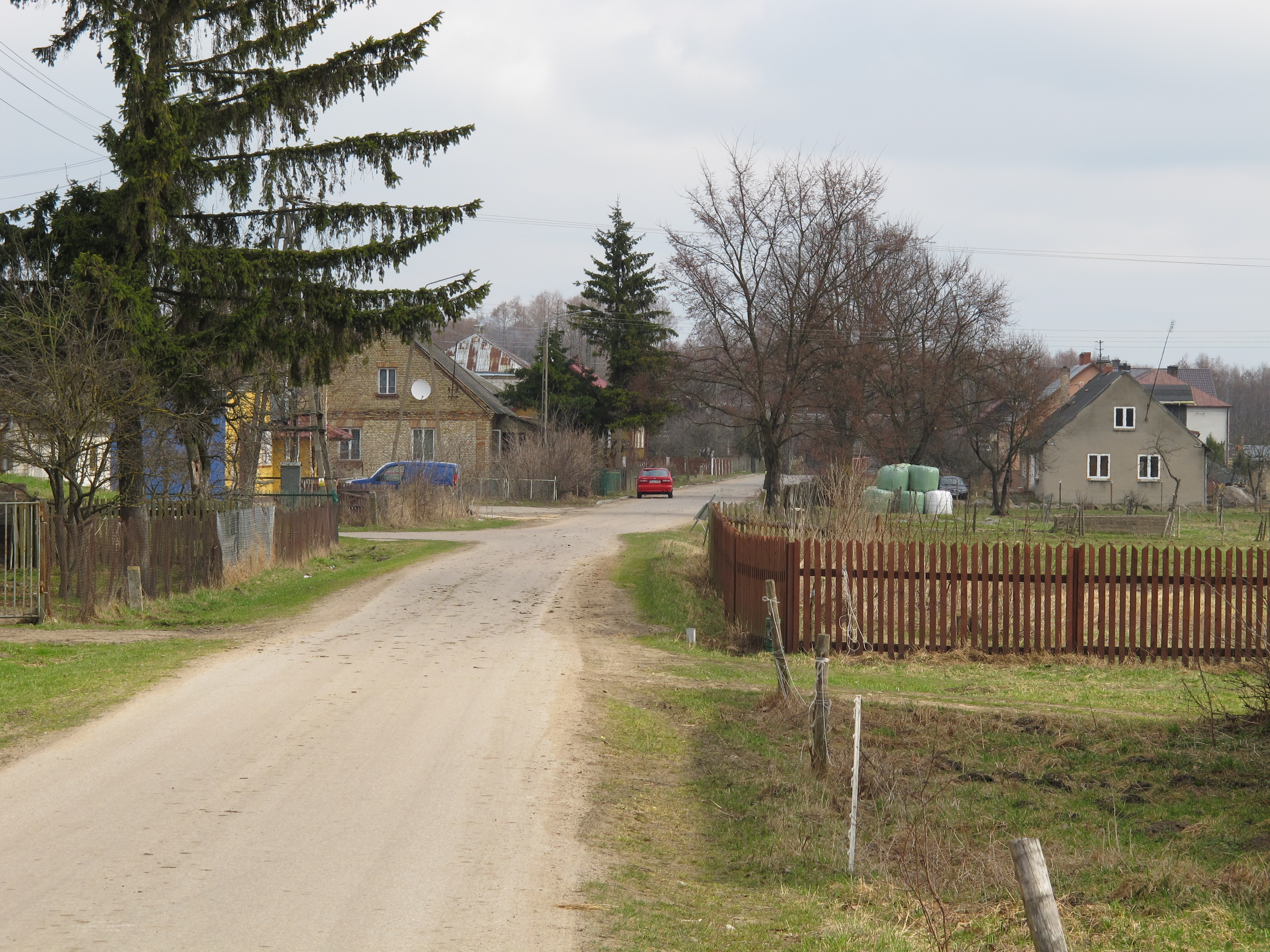
- View of the village in April 2010

- Location within Poland
- Coordinates: 53°9′18″N 22°51′56″E
- Country: Poland
- Voivodeship: Podlaskie
- County: Białystok
- Gmina: Tykocin

Rzędziany [ʐɛnˈd͡ʑanɨ] is a village in the administrative district of Gmina Tykocin, within Białystok County, Podlaskie Voivodeship, in north-eastern Poland.
