= Kobylin-Pieniążki =

Village in Gmina Kobylin-Borzymy,, Poland

- Village
- Location within Poland
- Coordinates: 53°06′14″N 22°40′13″E
- Country: Poland
- Voivodeship: Podlaskie
- County: Wysokie Mazowieckie
- Gmina: Kobylin-Borzymy

Kobylin-Pieniążki [kɔˈbɨlin pjɛˈɲɔ̃ʂki] is a village in the administrative district of Gmina Kobylin-Borzymy, within Wysokie Mazowieckie County, Podlaskie Voivodeship, in north-eastern Poland.
