= Kobylin-Borzymy =

- Village
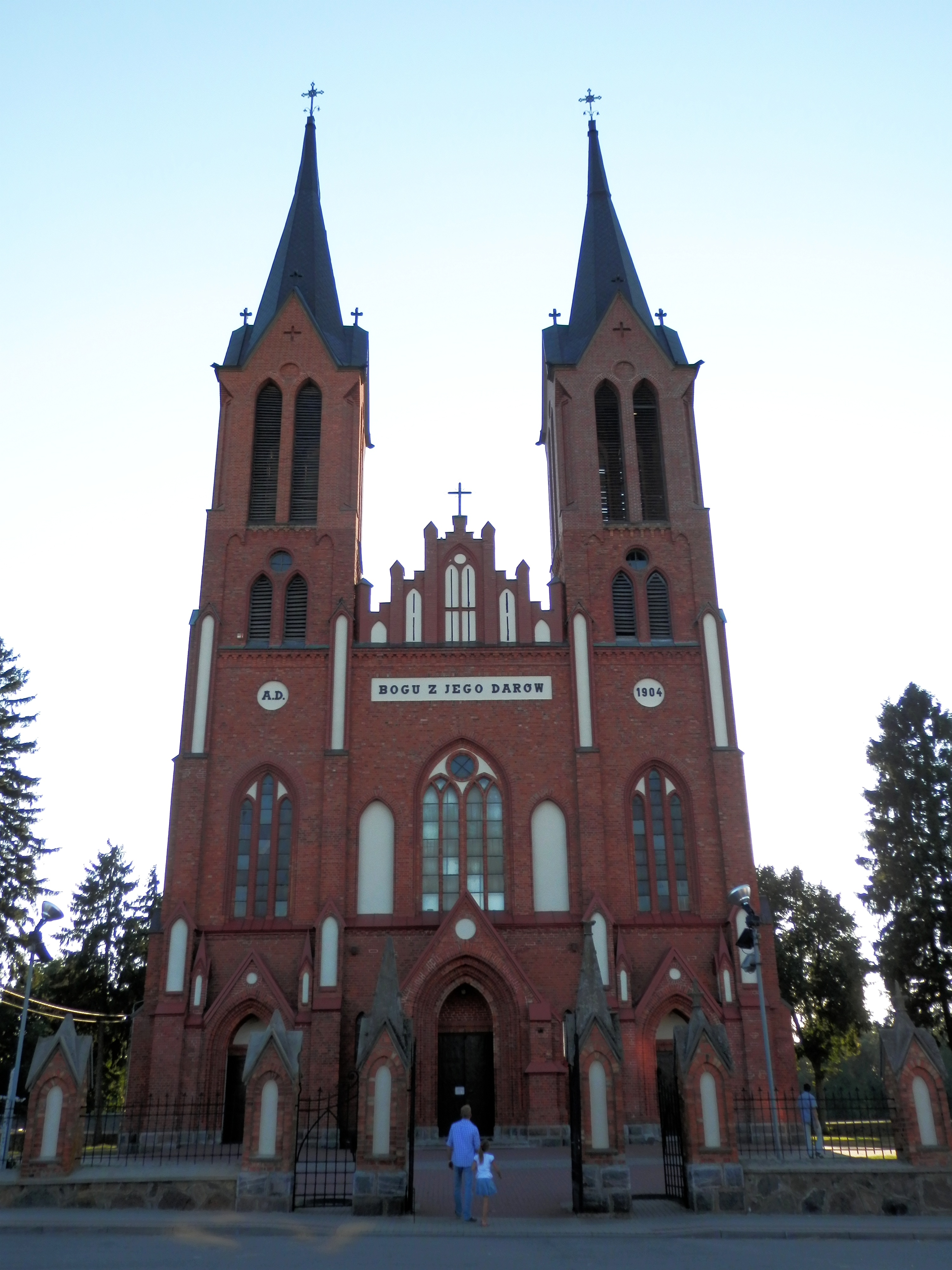
- Church of Saint Stanislaus

- Location within Poland
- Coordinates: 53°5′N 22°40′E
- Country: Poland
- Voivodeship: Podlaskie
- County: Wysokie Mazowieckie
- Gmina: Kobylin-Borzymy

Kobylin-Borzymy [kɔˈbɨlin bɔˈʐɨmɨ] is a village in Wysokie Mazowieckie County, Podlaskie Voivodeship, in north-eastern Poland. It is the seat of the gmina (administrative district) called Gmina Kobylin-Borzymy.
