= Kaniuki, Podlaskie Voivodeship =

Kaniuki
- Village
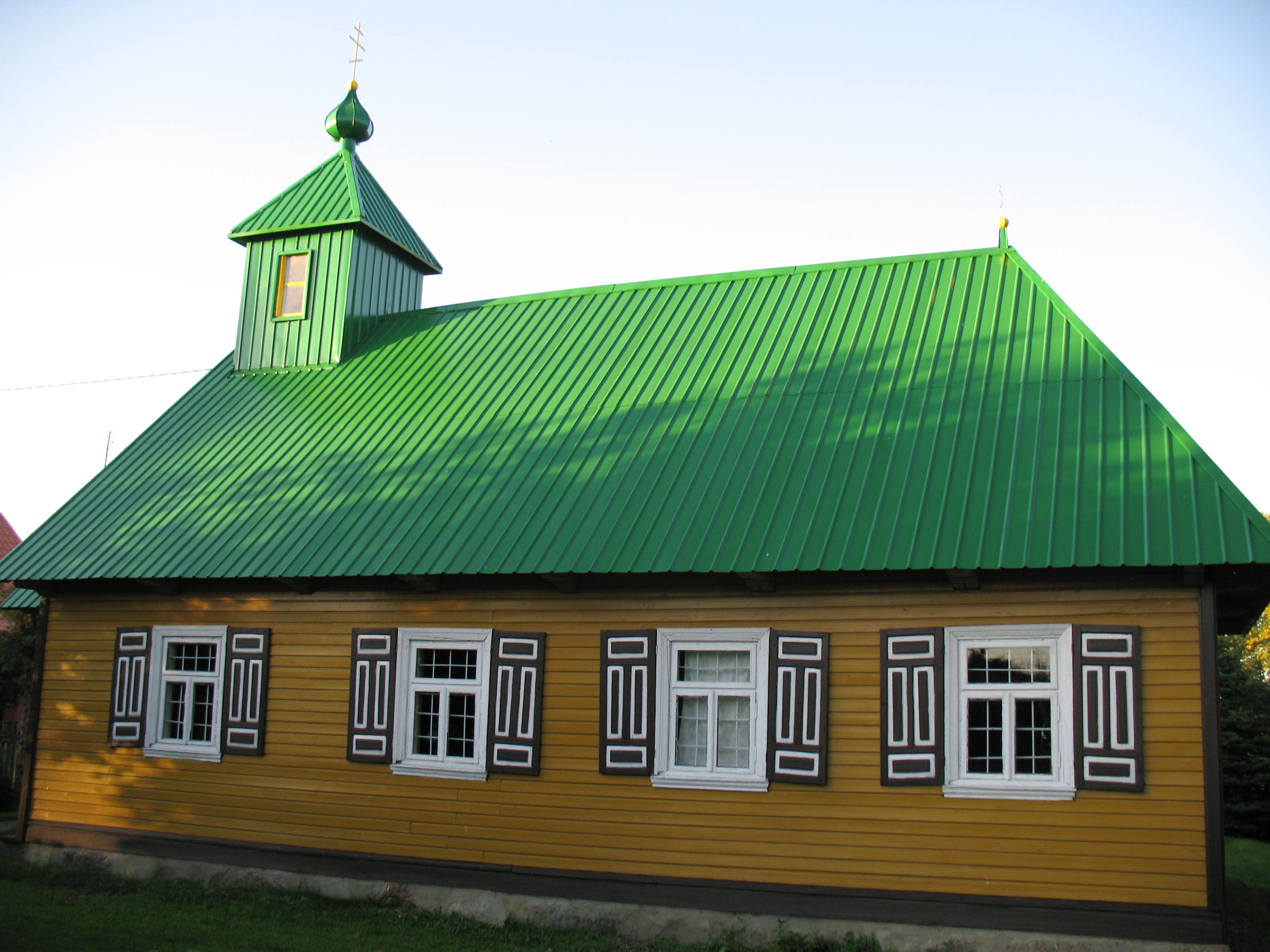
- Sts. Cyril & Methodius Orthodox Church chapel in Kaniuki

- Location within Poland
- Coordinates: 52°54′N 23°18′E
- Country: Poland
- Voivodeship: Podlaskie
- County: Białystok
- Gmina: Zabłudów
- Population: 140

Kaniuki [kaˈɲukʲi] is a village in the administrative district of Gmina Zabłudów, within Białystok County, Podlaskie Voivodeship, in north-eastern Poland.
