= Czerewki =

- Village
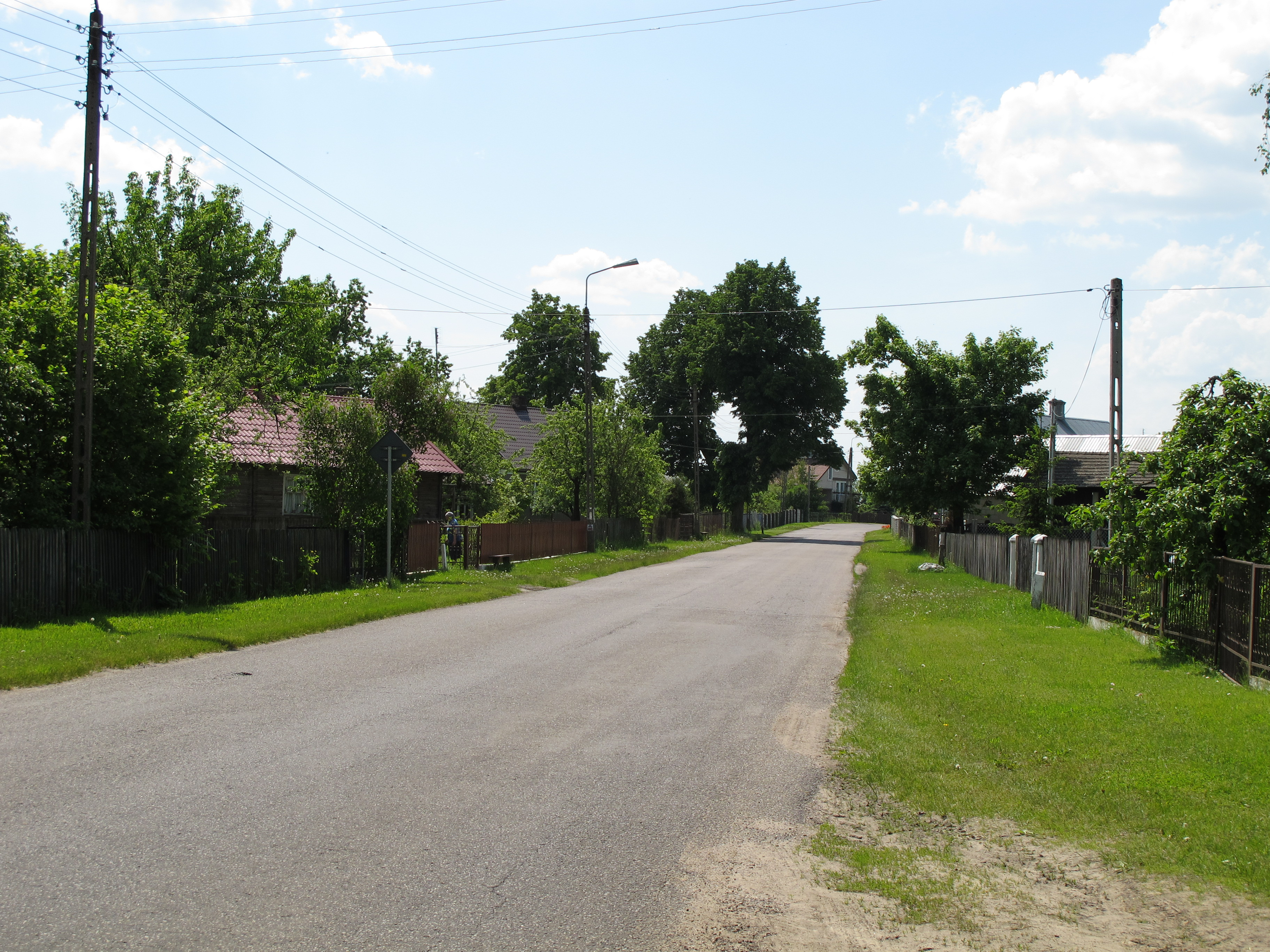

- Location within Poland
- Coordinates: 52°55′N 23°7′E
- Country: Poland
- Voivodeship: Podlaskie
- County: Białystok
- Gmina: Juchnowiec Kościelny

Czerewki [t͡ʂɛˈrɛfki] is a village in the administrative district of Gmina Juchnowiec Kościelny, within Białystok County, Podlaskie Voivodeship, in north-eastern Poland.
