= Narew Landscape Park =

Landscape park of Poland

Coordinates: 53.0511°N 22.9047°E

- Narwiański Park Krajobrazowy
- IUCN category V (protected landscape/seascape)
- Interactive map of Narew Landscape Park
- Location: Podlaskie Voivodeship
- Area: 73.50 km^{2} (28.38 sq mi)
- Established: 1985÷1996

Narew Landscape Park (Narwiański Park Krajobrazowy) was a Polish Landscape Park designated protected area within Podlaskie Voivodeship in northeastern Poland.

== Geography ==
The Landscape Park protects an area of 73.50 square kilometres (28.38 sq mi). It was established in 1985, and is a Natura 2000 EU Special Protection Area.

== History ==
It was established in the then Białystok Voivodeship under the Resolution of the Provincial National Council in Białystok of September 30, 1985. In 1989, by virtue of the resolution of WRN in Łomża, the areas belonging to the then Łomża Voivodeship were incorporated into the Park. The main task of the Park Management in the first years of its operation was to restore the section of the Narew Valley between Żółtki and the Rzędziany-Pańka dyke in order to restore the boggy and natural character. At that time, until 1990, the director of the Landscape Park was Bolesław Bielicki; in 1991 this function was performed by Witold Rurarz-Lipiński, and from the end of 1991 to the beginning of 1994 — by Andrzej Grygoruk (who also served as director in the years 1990–1991). In 1996, the Narew Landscape Park was transformed into the Narew National Park.

== See also ==
- Landscape parks in Poland
- Special Protection Areas in Poland
- Natura 2000 in Poland
