= Berliner (surname) =

Berliner is a surname. It originated primarily as a toponymic surname for a person from Berlin. Notable people with the surname include:

- Abraham Berliner (1833–1915), German theologian and historian
- Agneta Berliner (born 1958), Swedish politician
- Alain Berliner (born 1963), Belgian director
- Alan Berliner (born 1956), American filmmaker
- Arnold Berliner (1862–1942), German physicist
- Baruch Berliner (born 1942), Israeli writer and composer
- Cora Berliner (1890–1942), German economist
- Dana Berliner, American lawyer
- David Berliner (1938–2025), educational psychologist and professor of education at Arizona State University
- David Berliner (anthropologist) (born 1976), Belgian professor of anthropology
- Ellen Berliner (1920–2011), American activist
- Emile Berliner (1851–1929), German-American inventor
- Ernst Berliner (1880–1957), German scientist
- Gérard Berliner (1956–2010), French actor and composer
- Hans Berliner (1929–2017), American chess player, World Correspondence Chess Champion (1965–1968)
- Henry Berliner (1895–1970), United States aircraft and helicopter pioneer, son of Emile Berliner
- Herman A. Berliner (born 1944), American university administrator
- Isaac Berliner (1899–1957), Mexican-Jewish writer
- Janet Berliner (1939–2012), Bram Stoker Award-winning author
- Jay Berliner (born 1940), American guitarist
- Manfred Berliner (1853–1931), German teacher
- Mark Berliner (born 1951), American statistician
- Max Berliner (1919–2019), Polish-born Jewish Argentine actor
- Nancy Berliner (born 1954), American hematologist
- Nicholas Berliner, American diplomat
- Paul Berliner (ethnomusicologist) (born 1946), American ethnomusicologist, professor at Duke University
- Paul Berliner (trader), trader who settled charges of market manipulation with the Securities and Exchange Commission
- Roger Berliner (born 1951), American politician
- Sasha Berliner (born 1998), American vibraphonist
- Trude Berliner (1903–1977), Jewish actress forced to flee Europe when the Nazis came to power
- Uri Berliner (born 1956), American journalist

== See also ==
- Berlin (surname)
