= Orel =

Orel may refer to:

== Places ==
- Orel (Chrudim District), a municipality and village in Pardubice Region, Czech Republic
- Orel, a village in Sveti Nikole Municipality, North Macedonia
- Orel, Russia (Oryol), several inhabited localities in Russia
- Lake Orel, Khabarovsk Krai, Russia
- Orel Township, Wayne County, Illinois

== Vehicles ==
- Orel (spacecraft), a Russian crewed spacecraft in development
- Antey-Class SSGN "Orel", a guided missile submarine

== Other ==
- Orel (movement), a Moravian/Czech youth movement and gymnastics organization
- Orel (name)
- Project 1153 Orel, a Soviet aircraft carrier project
- Orel, a nickname given to French rapper and songwriter Orelsan
- Orel Anzio, an Italian Baseball League club
- Oril (Ukrainian: Оріль; Russian: Орель, Orel'), river in Ukraine

== See also ==
- Moral Orel, a television show on Adult Swim
- Oryol
- Orao
- Orzeł
