= Nachman =

Nachman, Nahman, or Nachmann (perhaps consoler) is a Hebrew given name and an Ashkenazic Jewish surname. Compare Nahmani (Neh. 7:7), Nehemiah, Nahum from the same triliteral root. The form Nachman was popular by the 4th century and shared by at least nine Talmudic rabbis.

By some Jews translated into Italian as Consolo. Derived surnames include Nachmani, Nachmanovici, Nachmanoviz, Nachmanowitz, Nachmansohn, Nachmanson, Nachmanovici, Nachmanovitch, Nachmias, Nacmias, Nahmanovitch, Nahmanowitz, Nahmanson, Nahmiech, Nahmoni, Nahmuni, Nacamu, Nacamulli, Nehmuka.

Notable people with the name include:

== Given name ==
- Rav Nachman (d. c. 320)
- Rav Nachman bar Yitzchak (d. 356)
- Nachman of Breslov (1712-1810)
- Nachman of Horodenka (d. 1765)
- Nahman Berlin (fl. 18th–19th century), German writer
- Nachman Krochmal (1785–1840), Galician philosopher, theologian and historian
- Nachman Chazan (1813–1884), Ukrainian Orthodox Jew
- Nachman Goldstein (died 1894), Ukrainian Orthodox rabbi
- Nachman Syrkin (1868–1924), Belarusian Zionist and writer
- Nachman Shlomo Greenspan (1878–1961), Talmudic scholar
- Nahman Avigad (1905-1992)
- Nachman Aronszajn (1907–1980), Polish-American mathematician
- Nachman Dushanski (1919–2008), Lithuanian communist
- Nahman Raz (1924-2015)
- Nachman Bulman (1925–2002), American rabbi
- Nachman Kahana (born 1937), Israeli rabbi
- Nachman Shai (born 1946), Israeli journalist and politician
- Nachman Ben-Yehuda (born 1948), Israeli sociologist
- Nachman Wolf (1951–2022), Israeli Paralympic athlete
- Nachman Fahrner (born 1972), Israeli musician
- Nachman Seltzer (born 1978), Orthodox Jewish writer

== Surname ==
- Samuel bar Nahman (3rd-4th century)
- Rabbah bar Nahmani (d. c. 320)
- Nachmanides (13th century)
- Fritz Nachmann (born 1929), West German luger
- Kurt Nachmann (1915–1984), Austrian screenwriter and film actor
- Werner Nachmann (1925 – 1988), German entrepreneur and politician
- Gerald Nachman (born 1938), American journalist and writer
- Ron Nachman (1942–2013), Israeli politician
- Jerry Nachman (1946–2004), American journalist
- Dana Nachman, American documentary filmmaker
- Rod Nachman, Alabama lawyer

=== Fictional characters ===
- Raphael Nachman, fictional mathematician in the late stories of Leonard Michaels
