= Oryol (disambiguation) =

Oryol is a city in Russia.

Oryol may also refer to:

== Places ==
- Oryol Oblast, a federal subject of Russia
- Oryol Governorate, an administrative unit of the Russian Empire from 1796 to 1928
  - Oryol electoral district (Russian Constituent Assembly election, 1917), covering the governorate
- Oryol (inhabited locality), multiple places in Russia

== Technology ==
- Oryol, a military radar set featured on Sukhoi Su-11 and Sukhoi Su-15 airplanes, among others
- Oryol or Orel (spacecraft), a project to develop a partially reusable crewed spacecraft
- Oryol, code name for a release of Astra Linux, a Russian Linux-based computer operating system

== Other uses ==
- FC Oryol, a football club based in the city of Oryol
- Russian ship Oryol, various Imperial Russian Navy ships
- Oryol (surname), Russian surname

== See also ==
- Oryol State University, in the city of Oryol
- Orel (disambiguation), an alternate spelling
