= Berlin (surname) =

This is a list of notable people with the surname Berlin.

- Abby Berlin, American filmmaker
- August Berlin (1910–1981), German politician
- Beatrice Winn Berlin (1922–1999), American painter, printmaker, teacher
- Ben Berlin (1896–1944), Estonian jazz musician
- Boris Berlin (1907–2001), Canadian pianist, music educator, arranger and composer
- Brent Berlin (born 1936), American anthropologist
- Brigid Berlin (1939–2020), American painter
- Brock Berlin (born 1981), American football quarterback
- Camille Berlin (1866 – ?) French painter.
- Dash Berlin (born 1979), Dutch DJ
- Elaine May (born 1932) née Elaine Iva Berlin, American comedian, filmmaker, comedian and actress
- Eve Berlin or Yves Berlin, bassist for St. Louis rock band Living Things
- Grace Berlin (1897–1982), American ecologist, ornithologist and historian
- Greta Berlin (born 1941), American pro-Palestinian activist
- Irving Berlin (1888–1989), Russian-born American composer
- Isaac Berlin (1867–1934), British stage actor as Ivan Berlyn
- Isaiah Berlin (1909–1997), Russian empire-born British social and political theorist, philosopher and historian of ideas
- Isaiah Berlin (rabbi) (1725–1799), Hungarian-born German Talmudic critic
- Jeannie Berlin (born 1949), American actor
- Jeff Berlin (born 1953), American musician
- Lillian Berlin (born 1982), lead singer for St. Louis rock band Living Things
- Laura Berlin (b. 1990), German actress and photomodel
- Lucia Berlin (1936–2004), an American short story writer
- Naftali Zvi Yehuda Berlin (1817–1893), Russian rabbi
- Nahman Berlin (fl. 18th–19th century), German writer
- Per Berlin (1921–2011), Swedish wrestler
- Saul Berlin (1740–1794), German Jewish scholar and supporter of the enlightenment
- Sven Berlin (1911–1999), British painter, fiction writer and sculptor
- Theodore H. Berlin (1917–1962), American theoretical physicist
- Vicki Berlin (born 1977), Danish actress
- Violet Berlin (born 1968), Turkish-born English television presenter
- William M. Berlin (1880–1962), American politician

== See also ==
- Berliner (surname)
- Meir Bar-Ilan, born Meir Berlin, who Hebraized his surname
