= Inno nazionale =

Inno nazionale means "national anthem" in Italian. It may refer to:

- "Il Canto degli Italiani", the national anthem of Italy
- "Inno Nazionale della Repubblica", the national anthem of San Marino
