= Nehemiah (disambiguation) =

Nehemiah is the central figure of the Book of Nehemiah in the Bible.

Nehemiah may also refer to:

- Book of Nehemiah, a book of the Hebrew Bible

== People ==
=== Given name ===
- Nehemiah Bourne (c. 1611–1690), British Royal Navy Admiral
- Nehemiah Chandler (born 2005), American football player
- Nehemiah (archbishop of Esztergom) (11th century)
- Nehemiah Grew (1641–1712), British plant physiologist
- Nehemiah Eastman (1782–1856), American lawyer, banker and politician
- Nehemiah Goreh (1825-1895), Hindu and Christian apologist from British India
- Nehemiah Hawkins (1833–1928), American inventor, publisher and author
- Nehemia Levtzion (1935—2003), Israeli historian
- Nehemiah Samuel Libowitz (1862–1939), Hebrew scholar and author
- Nehemiah Perry (cricketer) (born 1968), West Indian cricketer
- Nehemiah Persoff (1919–2022), American actor
- Nehemiah Pritchett (born 2001), American football player
- Nehemiah Shelton (born 1999), American football player
- Rabbi Nehemiah, a Rabbi who lived circa 150 AD
- Skip James (1902–1969), American blues musician, born Nehemiah Curtis James

=== Surname ===
- Renaldo Nehemiah (born 1959), American athlete

== Music ==
- Nehemiah (band), a metalcore band with Uprising Records
- "Nehemiah", a 2004 song by Hope of the States from The Lost Riots

== Other ==
- Nehemiah Corporation of America, a non-profit organization helping low income home buyers
- VIA Nehemeia, a VIA C3 CPU revision produced by VIA Technologies
- Nehemiah Scudder, the antagonist in Robert A. Heinlein's short novel If This Goes On—
