= Orzeł (disambiguation) =

Orzeł or Orzel may refer to:

- Orzeł, Greater Poland Voivodeship, a village in west-central Poland
- Orzeł, Masovian Voivodeship, a village in east-central Poland
- Orzeł (surname)

== Other uses ==
- Orzeł incident, a diplomatic incident at the beginning of World War II
- ORP Orzeł (disambiguation), the name of three submarines of the Polish Navy
- Orzeł-class submarine, a short-lived 1930s Polish Navy class
- The Eagle (1959 film), a Polish film
- Orzeł Kolno, a Polish football club
