= Consolo =

Consolo is an Italian surname. Notable people with this surname include:

- Benjamin Consolo (1806–1887), Italian translator
- Billy Consolo (1934–2008), American baseball player
- Bonnie Consolo (1938–2005), American motivational speaker
- Federico Consolo (1841–1906), Italian violinist and composer
- Vincenzo Consolo (1933–2012), Italian writer
- Gina Philips (1970) Italian-American actress
