= Paul Berliner =

Paul Berliner may refer to:

- Paul Berliner (ethnomusicologist) (born 1946), professor at Duke University
- Paul Berliner (trader), trader who settled charges of market manipulation with the Securities and Exchange Commission
