= Nachmann =

Nachmann is a German-language surname. Notable people with the surname include:

- Fritz Nachmann (born 1929), West German luger
- Kurt Nachmann (1915–1984), Austrian screenwriter and film actor
- Marianne Nachmann (1931–2026), West German luger, wife of Fritz
- Werner Nachmann (1925–1988), German entrepreneur and politician

== See also ==
- Nachman
