= Hymn of San Marino =

Song

Inno di San Marino
English: Hymn of San Marino
- Provisional anthem of San Marino
- Also known as: Giubilanti d'amore fraterno (English: Jubilant of Fraternal Love); Antico Inno Patrio (English: Old Patriotic Hymn)
- Lyrics: Aurelio Muccioli
- Music: Ulisse Balsimelli
- Relinquished: 1894
- Succeeded by: "Terra di Libertà"

The Hymn of San Marino (also known Giubilanti d'amore fraterno and Antico Inno Patrio) was a de facto national anthem of San Marino until 1894, with music by Ulisse Balsimelli and lyrics by Aurelio Muccioli.

While occasionally played during public ensemble exhibitions, no known sung performance has yet been recorded.

== Lyrics ==
=== Italian (original) ===
Giubilanti d’amore fraterno,

Salutiam la natale pendice!
Salutiam questa rupe felice
Vaga gemma dell’italo suol.
Libertà nostre case tutela
Libertà le nostr’alme ristora
Libertà, libertà sol c’infiora
Di dolcezza, di pace e d’amor.

CHORUS:
Giuriam fratelli – con tutto il core,
Al nostro tetto – perenne amor.
Giuriam, giuriam!

Qui il ladrone col mezzo suo capo
Non lordava i purissimi colli:
No! Di sangue non fumano molli
Questi Sassi del nostro Titan.
Qui fratelli, e non vili tiranni
Della Patria fan mite governo;
Prence e schiavo l’ammiran, né scherno
Del prezioso suo bene si fa.

CHORUS

Coronata di triplice torre
Che potenza suprema dinota,
Ah! non crolla, non cade, ma immota
Al variar dell’etadi si sta.
La funesta membranza d’un Giuda
Che rubar ci provò libertade,
Viva sempre nell’alme contrade
Quale storia d’orrendo squallor.

CHORUS

Di Marino la povera rupe
Salva, o Cielo, da’ fieri perigli;
E noi fidi, diletti suoi figli
Emulando le gloria n’andrem.
Giovanetti, se in core vi suona
Voce santa d’amore al Titano
Deh! posate sul petto la mano
E giurate serbar Libertà!

CHORUS

=== English translation ===
Jubilant of Fraternal love

we salute the native slope!
we salute this happy cliff
vague gem of Italic land.
Freedom protect our homes
Freedom restore our souls
Freedom, only freedom embellishes us
with peace, love and kindness

CHORUS:
Let us vow brothers, with all our soul
to our roof, everlasting love
We vow! We vow!

Here the thief with his corrupted head
did not soil the pure hills
NO! Of blood does not smoke soaking
These stones of our Titan
Here brothers and not vile Tirants
of the Fatherland make a peaceful government
Princes and slaves admire it and neither mockery
of its precious good is done

CHORUS

Crowned by triple Tower
that supreme power denotes
Ah! Does not crumble, does not fall but still
to the variation of ages it stands.
The baleful memory of a Judah
who tried to steal us freedom
let it live in the roads of our souls
as a story of horrendous misery

CHORUS

Of Marinus, the poor cliff
Save, oh heavens, from brave perils
and us, his beloved sons
emulating his glory we shall go.
Youngs, if in your hearts rings
(the) Holy voice of love for the Titan
Deh! Put your hands on your chest
and vow to preserve Freedom!

CHORUS
