= Kolno =

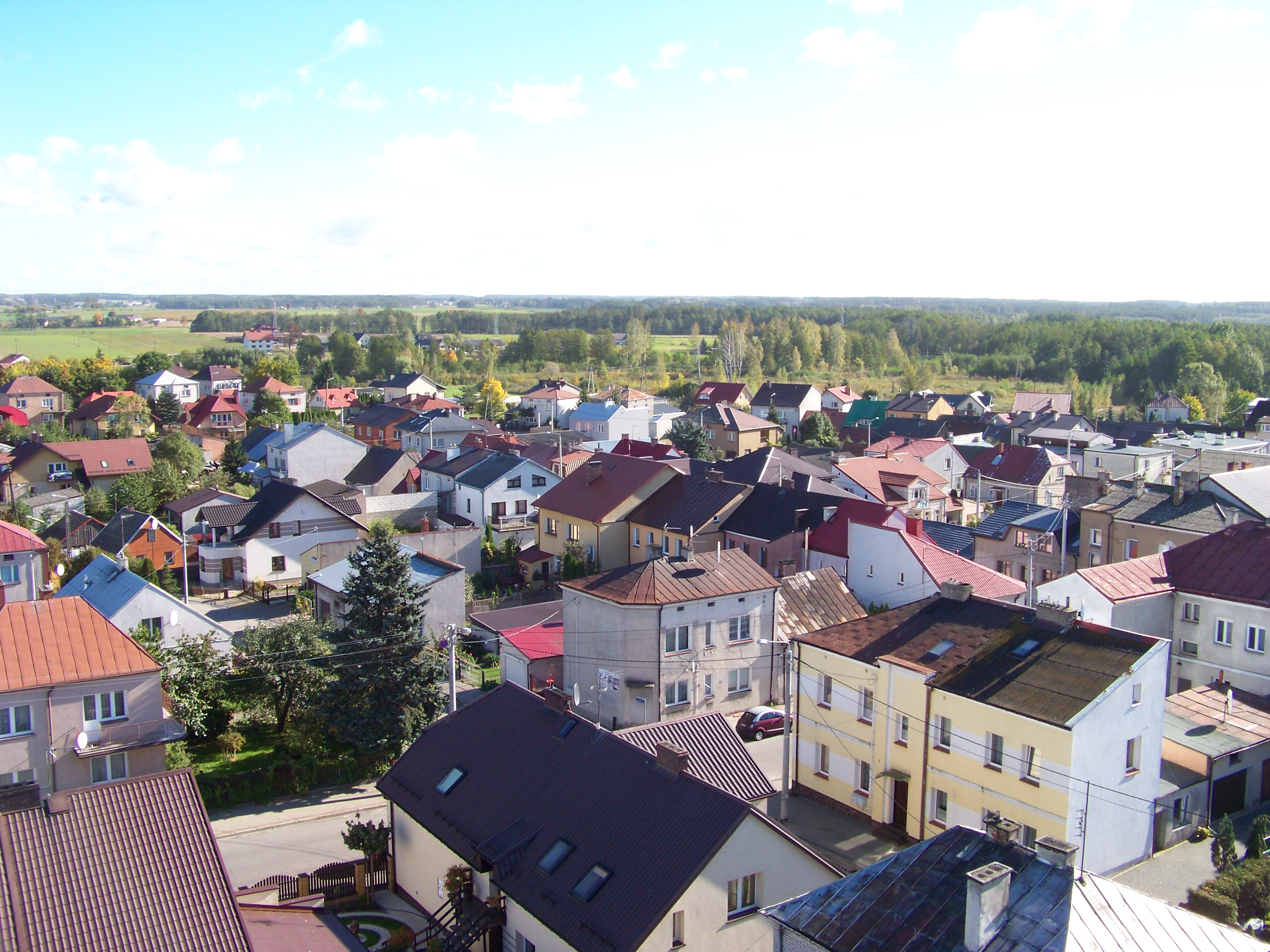
- Town centre

- Flag Coat of arms

- Location within Poland
- Coordinates: 53°24′38″N 21°56′2″E
- Country: Poland
- Voivodeship: Podlaskie
- County: Kolno
- Gmina: Kolno (urban gmina)
- Town rights: 1425

Government
  - Mayor: Andrzej Duda

Area
  - Total: 25.08 km^{2} (9.68 sq mi)

Population (2006)
  - Total: 10,751
  - Density: 428.7/km^{2} (1,110/sq mi)
- Time zone: UTC+1 (CET)
  - Summer (DST): UTC+2 (CEST)
- Postal code: 18–500
- Area code: +48 086
- Car plates: BKL
- Climate: Dfb
- Website: http://www.umkolno.pl

Kolno pronounced [ˈkɔlnɔ] is a town in northeastern Poland, located in the Podlaskie Voivodeship, about 150 km (93 mi) northeast of Warsaw. It is the seat of Kolno County, and the seat of the smaller administrative district (gmina) called Gmina Kolno, but it is not part of this district, as the town has gmina status in its own right. Kolno has 10,730 inhabitants (2007).

== History ==
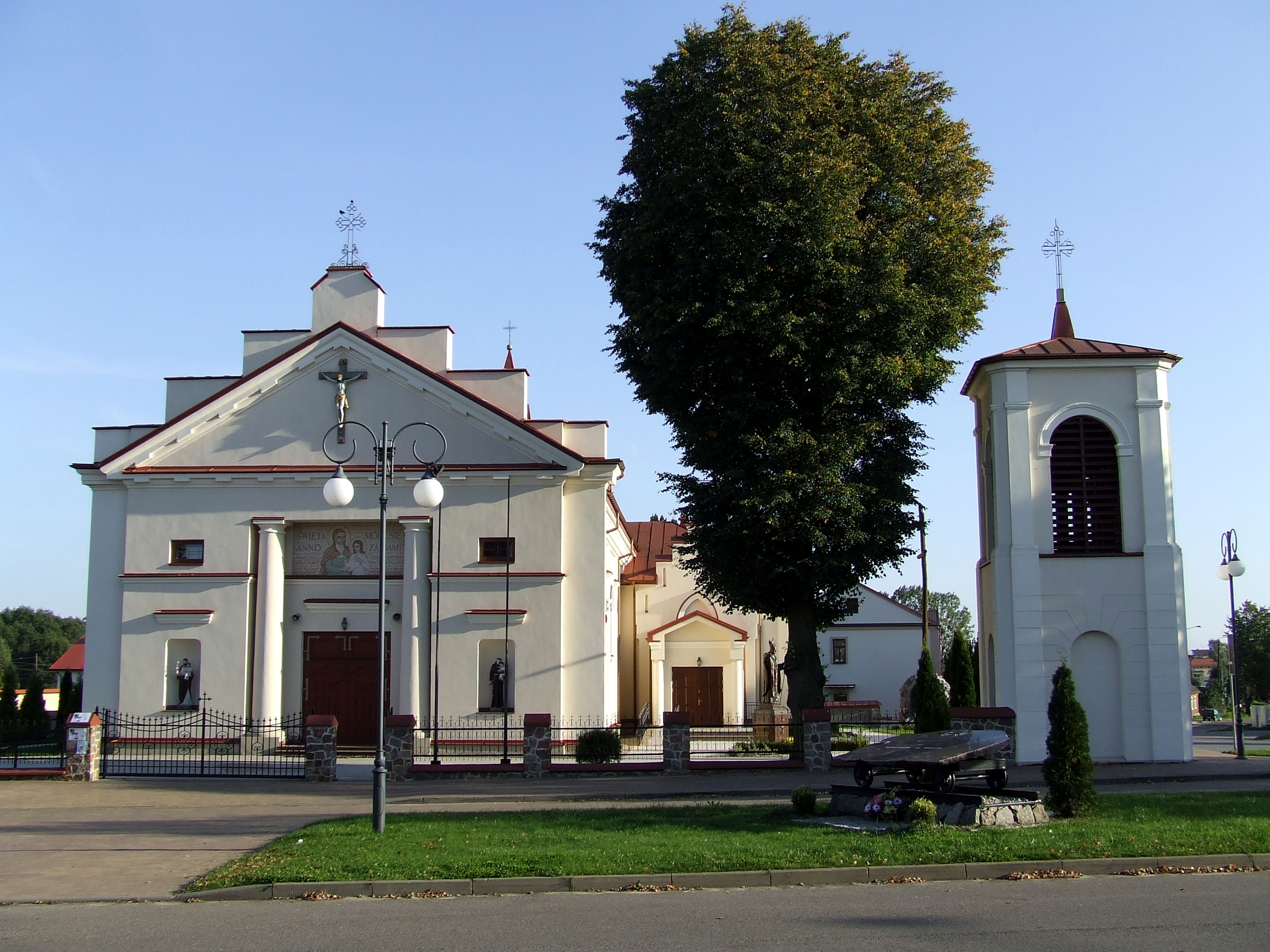
Neoclassical Saint Anne church

Lechitic (early Polish) settlement developed from the 8th century, and a stronghold was erected in the 8th or 9th century. In the 10th century it became part of the emerging Polish state. As a result of the fragmentation of Piast-ruled Poland, it formed part of the provincial Duchy of Masovia, before it was reincorporated directly to the Polish Crown. Kolno was first mentioned in 1222, and received town rights from Duke Janusz III of Masovia in 1425. Major economic expansion took place in the 16th century, with more trade and crafts. Kolno was a county seat and royal town of the Kingdom of Poland, administratively located in the Masovian Voivodeship in the Greater Poland Province.

Kolno was destroyed by fire during the Kościuszko Uprising (1794). After the Third Partition of Poland (1795) it became part of Prussia, till 1807, and subsequently, part of the short-lived Polish Duchy of Warsaw. From 1815 it belonged to Congress Poland in the Russian Partition of Poland. In the 19th century, many Jews settled in the town, following Russian discriminatory policies and the expulsion of Jews from Russia to the Russian Partition of Poland (see Pale of Settlement). After the massacres of Polish protesters committed by the Russians in Warsaw in 1861, Polish demonstrations and clashes with Russian soldiers took place in Kolno. Kolno was destroyed again in the First World War, during battle between Russian and German empires.

In 1918, it was eventually reintegrated with Poland, as the country regained independence after the First World War. On 25–26 August 1920, the Battle of Kolno was fought, in which the Polish 14th Infantry Division defeated the invading Soviets. It was the last battle of the large Battle of Warsaw, which definitely halted the Russian advance and the spread of communism westwards into Europe. According to the 1921 census, Kolno had a population of 4,494, 51.9% Polish and 48.0% Jewish.

=== Jan of Kolno ===
Polish historian and cartographer Joachim Lelewel (1786–1861) was the first to gather all available mentions of Jan of Kolno known as Johannes Scolnus, and claimed that Scolvus was really Jan z Kolna (English: John of Kolno), a Polish navigator of the Danish fleet. He also found mentions of a Joannis de Colno who studied at the Kraków Academy in 1455, and a Colno or Cholno family of merchants and sailors living in Gdańsk.

=== World War II ===
Following the Nazi German and Soviet invasion of Poland, which started World War II, Kolno was taken over by the German forces on 8 September 1939. On 12–13 September 1939, the German Einsatzgruppe V entered the town to commit various crimes against the populace. On 29 September Soviets entered the area in accordance with the Ribbentrop-Molotov Pact. The Soviets carried out mass deportations of the inhabitants to the Soviet Union. Already in 1939, the Polish resistance movement was organized in Kolno by Stanisław Milewski. The town remained under Soviet occupation until Operation Barbarossa (22 June 1941) when it was overrun again by the Wehrmacht.

On 5 July 1941, Hermann Göring and Erich Koch visited the town, and some 30 to 37 Jews were murdered by local Poles. The rest of the Jewish population, some 2,350 to 3,000 Jews, were executed by the Germans in several stages beginning on 15 July 1941. Six weeks later, only 80 Jews remained in Kolno, mostly craftsmen and artisans whom the Germans employed. The Polish resistance movement set up a unit in a local German administration office which produced forged documents for people who had escaped from German captivity or were in hiding to avoid arrest.

The leader of the local Polish resistance, Stanisław Milewski, was killed by the Germans in July 1944. The Soviet Army captured Kolno on the night of 23–24 January 1945 and ceded the town back to Poland, however, with a Soviet-installed communist regime, which remained in power until the Fall of Communism in the 1980s. In 1945–1947, the Polish anti-communist resistance raided local communist police stations six times.

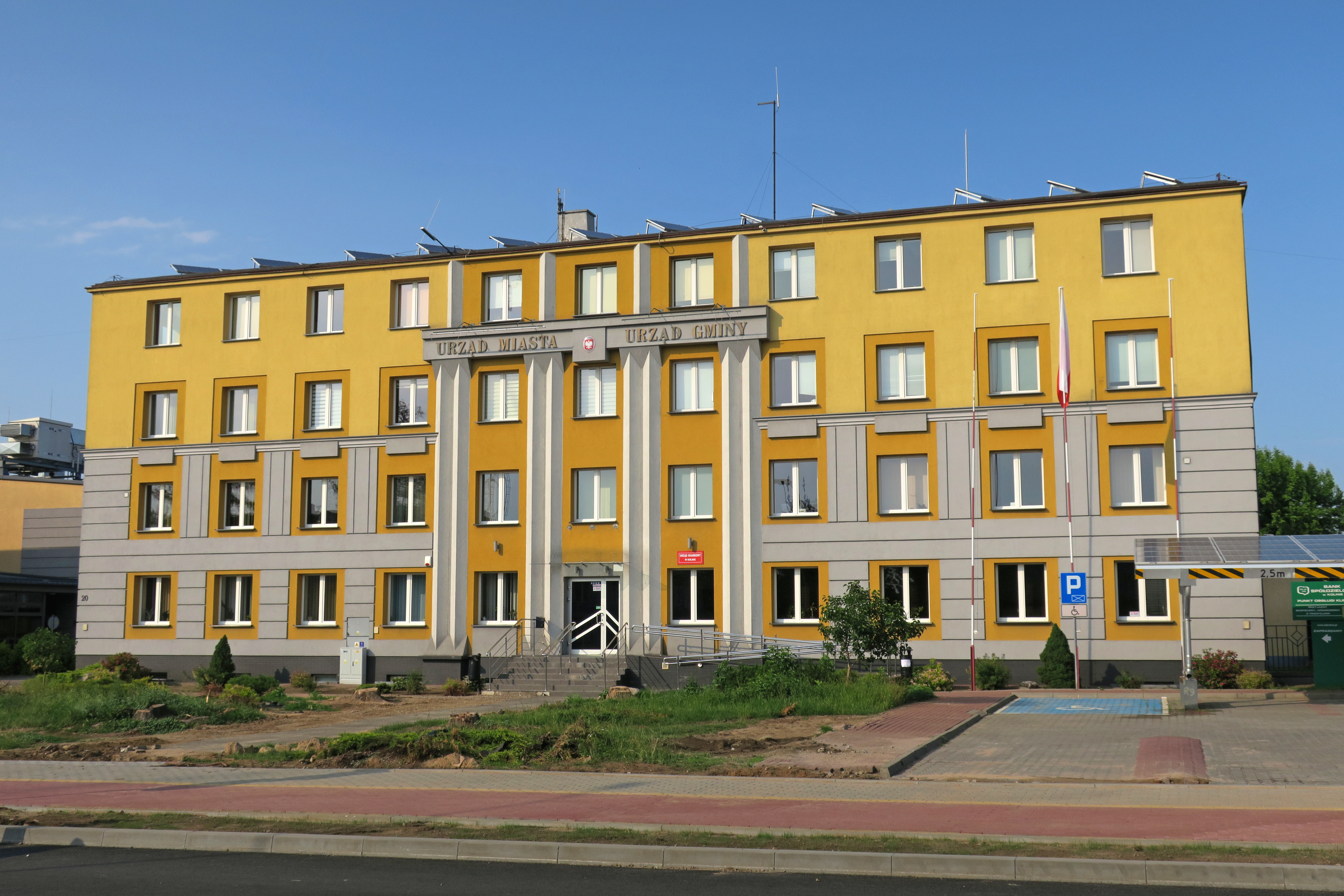
Municipal and gmina office

== Transport ==
Kolno stands on national road 63 which connects it to Pisz and to Łomża. Voivodeship road 647 bypasses Kolno to the south.

The nearest railway station to Kolno is to the north in Pisz.

== Sports ==
- Orzeł Kolno – football club

== Notable people ==
- Pessah Bar-Adon (1907-1985), Polish-Jewish Israeli archaeologist, writer
- Gertrude Blanch (1897-1996), Polish-Jewish American mathematician
- Abraham Samuel Herschberg (1858–1943), Polish-Jewish writer and scholar
- Stefan Kirtiklis (1890-1951), Polish politician, Voivode of Białystok Voivodeship
- Jan of Kolno (1435?-1484?), navigator of debated existence
- Barbara Kudrycka (born 1956), Polish politician, MEP, Minister of Science and Higher Education
- Maria Lani (1895-1954), Polish film actress, artists' model
- Albert Lewis (1884-1978), Polish-Jewish American Broadway producer, film producer
- Nehemiah Samuel Libowitz (1862-1939), Polish-Jewish American Hebrew scholar, author
- Krzysztof Łągiewka (born 1983), Polish footballer
- Dagmara Nocuń (born 1996), Polish handballer
- Janusz Smulko (born 1964), Polish engineer, professor
- Isaak Suwalski (born 1863), Hebrew-language writer, editor, and publisher active in Poland and the United Kingdom.
- Ze'ev Yavetz (1847-1924) Polish-Jewish historian, author, teacher, and one of the founders of the Mizrachi movement
- Eliezer Shulevitz (1848-1931) Polish-Jewish Rabbi, was the founder of the Lomza Yeshiva
- Ewa Piaskowska (born 1973), screenwriter and film producer
