= Isaak Suwalski =

Hebrew writer (1863–1913)

- Born: Isaak ben Samson Suwalski; 16 March 1863; Kolno, Łomża Governorate, Congress Poland
- Died: 19 May 1913 (aged 50); London, United Kingdom
- Occupations: Writer, editor, publisher
- Writing career
- Language: Hebrew

Isaak Suwalski (Hebrew: יצחק סובאלסקי; 16 March 1863 – 19 May 1913) was a Hebrew-language writer, editor, and publisher active in Poland and the United Kingdom.

== Biography ==
Suwalski was born in 1863 in Kolno, in the Łomża province of Congress Poland. He received a traditional Jewish education and began writing at a young age. From 1881, he contributed articles to several Hebrew newspapers, including Ha-Levanon, Ha-Tzefira, and Ha-Melitz.

In 1889, Suwalski published Ḥayye ha-Yehudi ʿal pi ha-Talmud, on the way of life and moral duties of the Jew according to Talmudic principles, arranged by subjects with references from the Talmud and Midrashim. The work was published in several editions, and translated into German and Danish.

Between 1890 and 1891, he edited and published in Warsaw the multi-volume Hebrew literary anthology Keneset ha-Gedolah. This collection included rabbinic and Talmudic essays, literary notes, poetry, and works of fiction by several writers.

In 1895, Suwalski emigrated to London, where he settled in the East End and became active in Jewish cultural and communal life. In 1897, he founded the Hebrew weekly Ha-Yehudi, which he produced until his death in 1913. Suwalski was President of the Zionist National League, which in 1899 voted to affiliate with the English Zionist Federation.

== Selected publications ==
- Ḥayye ha-Yehudi ʿal pi ha-Talmud [The Life of the Jew According to the Talmud]. Warsaw. 1889. Ethical compendium of Talmudic teachings.
- Keneset ha-Gedolah [The Great Assembly]. Warsaw. 1890–1891. Four-volume anthology of rabbinic and literary writings.
- Ha-Yehudi [The Jew]. London. 1897–1913. Hebrew weekly periodical founded and edited by Suwalski.
