= Maria Lani =

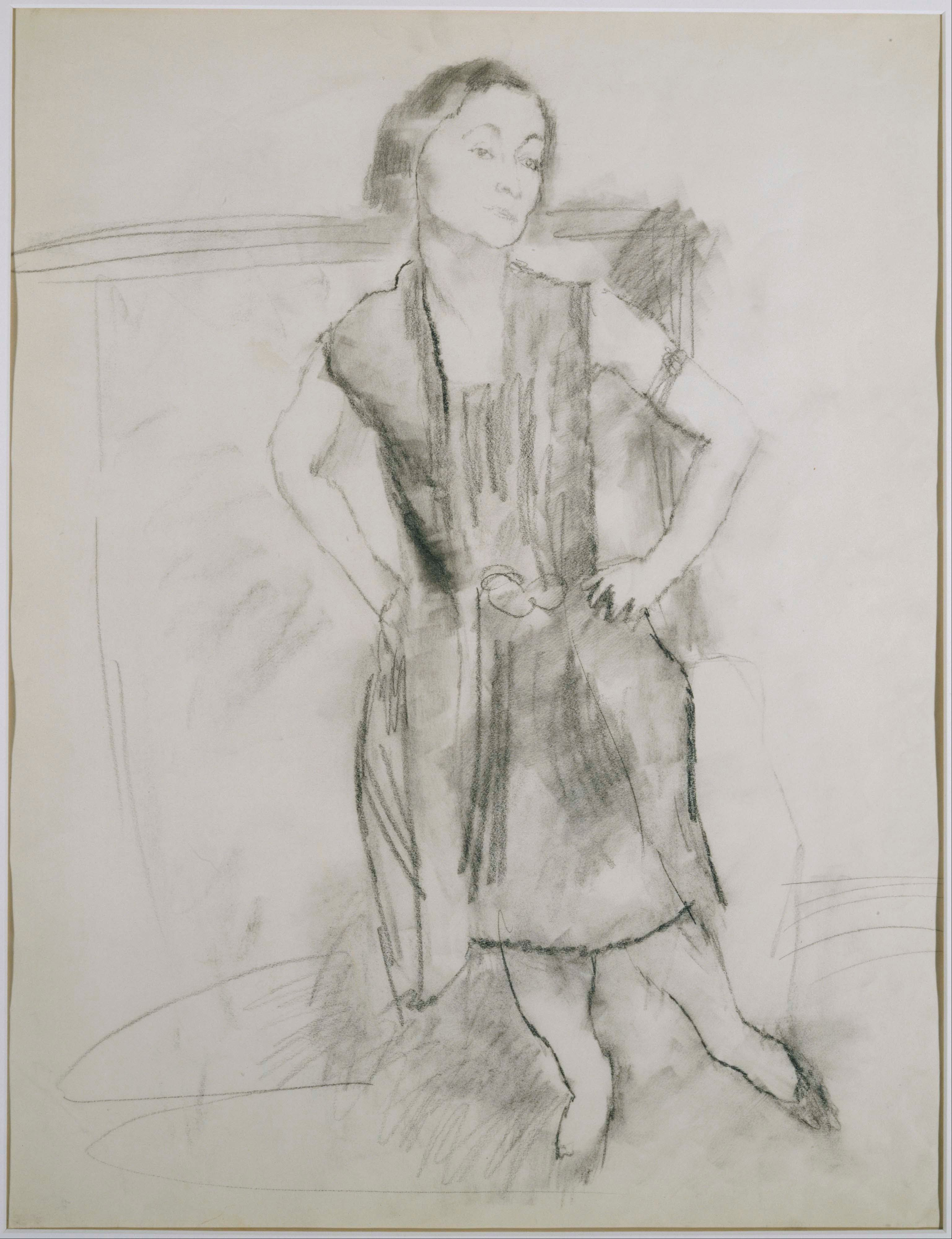
Maria Lani by Jules Pascin, charcoal on paper, The Phillips Collection, Washington, D.C.

Maria Lani (Maria Jeleniewicz; 24 June 1895 – 1954) was an aspiring film actress and artists' model. In the late 1920s she was portrayed in paintings and sculpture by over 50 artists, including Bonnard, Chagall, Cocteau, Derain, Matisse, Rouault, and Suzanne Valadon.

== Biography ==
Maria Lani was born in Kolno, Poland, and grew up in Częstochowa and in Poland.

She went to Paris in the spring of 1928 and proclaimed herself to be a silent film star who had worked in Berlin. Together with her husband, Maximilian Abramowicz, and her brother, Alexander, the trio claimed to be working on a film which required multiple portraits as part of the plot. She befriended Jean Cocteau, who enthusiastically endorsed the project and with his encouragement, 59 artists made portraits of her.

A limited edition book about Lani and the portraits was published in 1929 by Éditions des Quatre Chemins, Paris with essays by Cocteau, Mac Ramo, and Waldemar George. It included 51 plates of reproductions.

The film never materialized, but the portraits were exhibited as a group in Europe and the United States, and Lani and Abramowicz kept them in their possession.

In 1941 they moved to New York City, where she worked at the Stage Door Canteen, a recreational center for servicemen.

They returned to Paris after the war, where she died in 1954 and was buried in a pauper's grave.

== Notes ==
- In the late 1930s, Thomas Mann coauthored a screen play that was inspired by Lani. "Jean Renoir agreed to direct, with Garbo to star."
- The 3 December 1945 issue of Life magazine reproduced 15 of the portraits.
- Lani was an inspiration for fashion designer John Galliano's spring/summer collection in 2011, and he referenced the portraits in the outfits of the models.
