= Russian ship Oryol =

At least six ships of the Imperial Russian Navy and one ship of the Russian Coast Guard have been named Oryol (Eagle). The name is often rendered in English-language sources as Orel, but this is a poor transliteration of the Cyrillic.

- Russian frigate Oryol (1668) - frigate destroyed at Astrakhan by rebels in 1670
- Russian ship of the line Oryol (1807) - 74-gun ship of the line that fought in the Napoleonic Wars and was scrapped in 1833
- Russian ship of the line Oryol (1833) - 74-gun ship of the line scrapped in 1848
- Russian ship of the line Oryol (1854) - 84-gun ship of the line converted to steam power while still under construction
- Russian hospital ship Oryol (1889) - Hospital ship captured by Japan during the Battle of Tsushima in 1905
- Russian battleship Oryol - Borodino-class pre-dreadnought battleship captured by Japan during the Battle of Tsushima in 1905
- Russian frigate Oryol (1985) - Nerey-class (Krivak III) frigate of the Russian Coast Guard, former Imeni XXVII siezda KPSS.
