= Olga Matveevskaya =

Russian educator and politician

Member of the Constituent Assembly
- In office 1918
- Constituency: Oryol

Personal details
- Born: 1882

Olga Aleksandrovna Matveevskaya (Russian: Ольга Александровна Матвеевская, born 1882) was a Russian educator and politician. In 1917 she was one of the ten women elected to the Constituent Assembly, the country's first female parliamentarians.

== Biography ==
Born in 1882, Matveevskaya grew up in a middle-class family and was educated at home. She later worked as a teacher in Pryluky. She joined the Socialist Revolutionary Party and was under police supervision since 1907, later being exiled to Arkhangelsk.

In 1917 she was a Socialist-Revolutionary candidate in Oryol in the Constituent Assembly elections, and was one of ten women elected to the legislature. She later died in a prison or prison camp.
