= Abraham Samuel Herschberg =

Abraham Samuel Herschberg (December 29, 1858 – August 17/18, 1943) was a Polish Jewish writer and scholar mainly based in Białystok who died in the Holocaust.

== Life ==
Herschberg was born on December 29, 1858, in Kolno, Łomża Governorate, Congress Poland, the son of Israel Herschberg.

When Herschberg was five, he and his family moved to Warsaw, where his father became factory manager in an estate owned by his great-uncle Zusman Yavetz. When he was twenty, he married the daughter of merchant Mordekhay-Shloyme Vendel and moved to Białystok, where he became a textile manufacturer. He was also a close associate of the city's chief rabbi Samuel Mohilever and a member of the early Zionist group Hibbat Zion.

In 1899, Herschberg went to Ottoman Palestine and spent eighteen months there before returning to Białystok. He wrote two Hebrew books about his impressions of his time there, Mishpat ha-Yishuv ha-Chadash be-Eretz Yisrael in 1901 and Ba'aretz ha-Mizrach in 1910. The first book was critical of Baron Rothschild's officials, including their management of the economy and their poor relationship with the Jewish settlements of the First Aliyah. The book was criticized in Hibbat Zion circles at the time, with Ahad Ha'am considering its account exaggerated, but it later became considered an objective source of Jewish settlements during that period.

Upon his return to Białystok, he started writing for Hebrew periodicals about political and economic questions as well as investigations into the industrial and cultural life of ancient Jews. He wrote about ancient Jewish clothing in Hahalbashah Haivrit Hakedumah in 1911, and in 1924 he wrote a section of Haereg Vetaasiyat Haereg that dealt with the cultural life of Jews in Talmudic period. He also wrote Hebrew translations of Rudolf Kittel and Joseph Eschelbacher.

Herschberg edited the Bialystoker Tageblat, Białystok's first daily Yiddish newspaper, from 1913 to 1914. When the Germans occupied the city during World War I, he was a co-founder of the Jewish city council, a hostel for the poor, and Mishmeret Holim. After the war, he retired from community and work and focused exclusively on scholarly research. He intended to write a six-volume Hebrew work called Haye Hatarbut Beyisrael Bitekufat Hamishna Vehatalmud (Cultural Life in Israel in the Era of the Mishnah and Talmud), but he only published the first volume along with fragments in different periodicals.

The Jewish Telegraphic Agency reported that Herschberg died in 1940, but this proved erroneous. He was in the Białystok Ghetto during World War II. Ber Mark reported that he was killed during the liquidation of the Ghetto on August 17 or 18, 1943. Most of his manuscripts were lost during the war, but he sent his two-volume history of Białystok Pinkos Białystok to America in 1938 and it was published there after the war.
