= Federico Consolo =

Italian violinist and composer

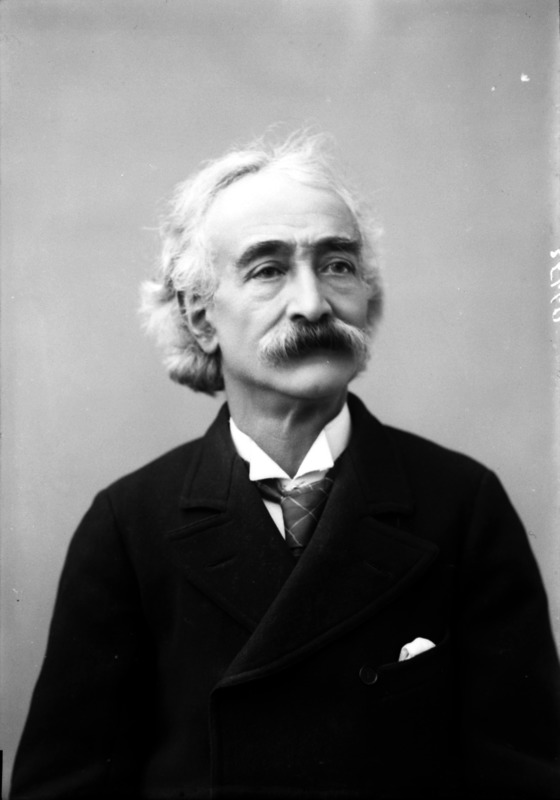
Italian violinist and composer, Federico Consolo

Federico Consolo (4 April 1841 – 14 December 1906) was an Italian violinist and composer.

== Background and earlier life ==
Federico Consolo was born to Benjamin Consolo at Ancona in 1841. After studying the violin with Ferdinando Giorgetti in Florence and Vieuxtemps in Brussels, and composition with Fétis and Liszt, he played with great success at almost all the European courts and in the Orient. In 1884, however, he was compelled by a nervous affliction to discontinue violin-playing. He removed to Florence, and devoted himself to composition.

== National anthem of San Marino ==
He composed the arrangement for the national anthem of San Marino, based on a 10th-century chorale, with lyrics by Giosué Carducci. It was adopted in 1894.

== Other works ==
Other works include a number of Oriental cycles, concertos, and "Shire Yisrael" ("Libro dei Canti d'Israel," Florence, Bratti Edzioni, 1869), a collection of Sephardic synagogal melodies and original compositions. He subsequently undertook archeological studies, writing on musical notation, and especially on music in the Bible. He was a knight of several orders in different states.

== See also ==
- Inno Nazionale della Repubblica (in English)
