= Nehemiah Corporation of America =

American nonprofit organization

- Type: Nonprofit
- Founded: 1994
- Founder: Don Harris
- Headquarters: Sacramento, California
- Key people: Scott Syphax, CEO
- Website: www.nehemiahcorp.org

Nehemiah Corporation of America is a non-profit organization based in Sacramento, California specializing in homeownership, affordable housing and community development. It started in 1994 as a small organization, but grew to prominence later in the 1990s after it developed a program that allowed home buyers to make down payments on their purchases using funds that were derived from the home sellers. This program, the Nehemiah Program, became popular and was widely emulated, giving birth to what came to be known as the seller-funded down-payment assistance industry. The industry attracted criticism from U.S. federal agencies (particularly the Government Accountability Office and the Internal Revenue Service) and was ultimately shut down in 2008 by a change in federal law.

Since 2008, the Nehemiah Corporation has been operating as a social enterprise organization. Via its affiliates and subsidiaries, it has been providing real-estate development capital for low-income neighborhoods, as well as providing instructional and other resources related to individual finance and home ownership. It also sponsors management training for young adults.

== The Nehemiah Program ==
The Nehemiah Program is not to be confused with the Nehemiah Housing Opportunity Grants ("NHOP") program enacted in 1988 by Title VI of the Housing and Community Development Act of 1987. NHOP ceased operation in 1991 and was unrelated to the program described here.

=== Background ===
When mortgage lenders consider whether to underwrite a particular loan, they look to factors such as the creditworthiness of the borrower and the amount of down payment the borrower will be making. The amount of the down payment required by the mortgage lender can be as high as 20% of the home's purchase price. In the United States, the down payment requirement can be substantially reduced if repayment of the mortgage is guaranteed by the Federal Housing Administration ("FHA"), an agency within the Department of Housing and Urban Development ("HUD"). The required down payment under such FHA insured loans has varied over time; in the 1990s it was 3% of the home's purchase price.

In its original form, the qualification requirements for an FHA insured loan called for the borrower to be his/her own source of funds for the down payment. In 1996, the U.S. Congress amended the statute to permit the down-payment funds to come from a family member of the borrower. However, HUD subsequently issued guidelines that considerably expanded the list of exceptions beyond that which appeared in the statute. The expanded list included, for example, the borrower's employer or labor union. The expanded list also included "charitable organizations". That guideline also noted that "As a rule, our concern is not with how the donor obtains the gift funds provided they are not derived in any manner from a party to the sales transaction". In 1996, HUD issued Mortgagee Letter 96–18, stating "a nonprofit or other organization that provides bona fide gifts to eligible participants should not compel the beneficiary to purchase only properties owned by the donor of the funds. Such scenarios cloud the motivations of the purchaser/borrower as well as the donor".

=== Birth of the Nehemiah Program ===
Website logo (c. 2002).

In March 1997, the Nehemiah Progressive Housing Development Corporation filed for approval of its Nehemiah Program with HUD's Sacramento field office. (Here, "approval" means that lenders would have written assurance, via an "approval letter", that monies received by the borrower from the Nehemiah Program satisfied HUD's guidelines for gift funds.) Nehemiah received a provisional 60-day approval, followed by a six-month approval for a demonstration program. However, similar filings in other HUD field offices were not being approved, so Nehemiah filed for a nationwide approval at HUD's headquarters in Washington. When that approval was not forthcoming, Nehemiah sued HUD in a federal court.

According to a report from HUD's Office of Inspector General, the Nehemiah Program operated as follows:

1. Prospective recipients of Nehemiah funds made application to Nehemiah and agreed to purchase a home from a seller who also participated in the program.
2. Shortly before the closing of the sale, Nehemiah wired funds to the closing agent. This amount was described as a gift to the homebuyer.
3. Shortly after the sale, the closing agent wired funds to Nehemiah. These funds came from the seller's proceeds and typically exceeded the amount originally wired by Nehemiah. Originally, this amount was described as a service fee but, starting in August 1999, it was called a charitable contribution (to Nehemiah).

While the requested approval was pending in Washington, HUD asked its Office of General Counsel for a legal determination as to whether the Nehemiah Program satisfied its requirements for gifted funds. In April 1998, the General Counsel responded that the program did meet those requirements, finding that the funds given to the buyer were not "directly tied" to the seller. HUD then issued a letter of approval for the Nehemiah Program and the lawsuit between the two parties was settled out-of-court. In June 1998, HUD issued a memorandum to all of its field offices, informing them of their approval of the Nehemiah Program, as well as any other similar program.

With the receipt of the April 1998 approval letter, the Nehemiah Program became the first private nonprofit organization to receive such written approval for a seller-funded down payment assistance program.

=== Critiques of the Nehemiah Program ===
In May 1999, HUD's Office of Inspector General ("OIG") initiated an audit of HUD's treatment of down-payment assistance programs operated by private nonprofit organizations, doing so in response to what it described as "citizen concerns". The audit report, issued in March 2000 (herein, the "OIG 2000 report"), concluded that HUD had been allowing the organizations to operate their programs in a way that circumvented FHA requirements. The stated rationale for this conclusion was the OIG's finding that the assistance was not a "true gift", because the nonprofit organization was being reimbursed by the seller. The OIG also presented evidence that (i) the default rate for persons receiving the assistance was "significantly higher" than the average default rate for other FHA insured loans and (ii) some sellers were raising the sales price of their properties to cover the cost of the assistance, thus requiring the homebuyers to finance higher loan amounts. Nehemiah had been given access to a draft version of the report, along with an opportunity to comment and respond. In its response, Nehemiah noted that its program did comply with FHA requirements (as determined by HUD). It also disputed the accuracy of OIG's assessment of the default risk of the program's participants, offering evidence that the "Nehemiah-assisted FHA borrowers are outperforming the FHA loan pool ... in every category of loan performance".

In March 2001, HUD asked its OIG to re-examine the performance of FHA insured loans that received down-payment assistance from private nonprofit organizations. The OIG's report was published in September 2002 (herein, the "OIG 2002 report"). It found that the default rate for Nehemiah-assisted loans was about double that of other FHA insured loans. It also found that, although the number of loans that had received down-payment assistance from any private nonprofit organization (not just Nehemiah) was a relatively small percentage of the entire FHA pool (at about 4%), the percentage was increasing. For the most recent six months of the OIG's data collection, those loans represented about one in seven of all new FHA insured loans. The report also found that Nehemiah-assisted loans comprised about half of all private-nonprofit-assisted loans (in the full data period).

The Milken Institute performed a study of the Nehemiah Program and published a report on it in April 2004 (herein, the "Milken study"). Although the report did not explicitly identify the parties who had commissioned the study, its Acknowledgement page listed the Nehemiah Corporation of America, the United States Conference of Mayors, and CitiesFirst. The study generally found that the nationwide surge in home prices in the United States "created additional wealth" for recipients of the Nehemiah Program and that an expansion of homeownership had "positive tax consequences" for the counties in which the recipients lived.

When the Milken study was published, HUD had already commissioned its own study of seller-funded down-payment assistance programs. It was performed by the Concentrance Consulting Group and published in March 2005 (herein, the "Concentrance study"). Unlike the earlier OIG reports, the Concentrance study was based largely on a cross-sectional analysis of data collected in interviews with individual homebuyers, sellers and various types of real-estate professionals in ten metropolitan areas. Their findings corroborated some of the claims made by the nonprofit organizations, particularly that the typical recipient was a person who would not otherwise have been able to become a home owner. But the interviewees also generally corroborated some of the claims made by detractors of the programs—that sellers were routinely raising their sales prices to recoup the payment made to the nonprofit organization, and that the price increases led to higher loan costs for the buyers along with a higher risk of default on their loans. The study was not restricted to the Nehemiah Program; no particular program was singled out in the body of the report. However, the appendices gave summary results of questionnaire answers from real-estate professionals. These results indicated that the Nehemiah Program was the most active program in the ten metropolitan areas covered by the study.

The Government Accountability Office ("GAO") published its own report in November 2005 (herein, the "GAO study"). The report examined trends in the use of seller-funded down-payment assistance, its impact on home prices, the performance of the FHA insured loans that had received this assistance, and the standards used by the FHA for approving and monitoring these loans. Its findings generally corroborated those of the earlier government reports and studies. Specifically, the GAO found that (i) the percentage of FHA insured loans that had received down-payment assistance from nonprofit organizations was increasing and that, by 2004, they accounted for approximately one in every three new loans insured by the FHA, (ii) the seller-funded programs created an "indirect stream" of funds from sellers to buyers that caused the home buyers to pay higher prices, and (iii) loans that received down-payment assistance had higher delinquency and default rates than those that did not receive it (and that seller-funded down-payment assistance programs comprised about 95% of all FHA insured loans that received any type of down-payment assistance from a nonprofit organization). Although the report did not focus on any particular program, it did identify Nehemiah as one of the three programs that accounted for most of the seller-funded down-payment assistance found in FHA insured loans.

=== Government responses ===
While the original OIG audit was being conducted, HUD proposed a change in its regulations that would affect seller-funded down-payment assistance programs. Proposed in September 1999, the change was intended to "prevent a seller from providing funds to an organization as a quid pro quo for that organization's downpayment assistance for purchases of one or more homes from the seller". The proposed change was never implemented. Citing a profound lack of public support for the proposal, it was formally withdrawn in January 2001.

Legislative responses began in early 2004, when a subcommittee of the House Committee on Financial Services held hearings on a bill that would create a so-called Zero Downpayment Program administered by the FHA. The president of the Nehemiah Corporation gave testimony at those hearings, expressing concern about a provision in the bill that would allow FHA to assess mortgage-insurance premiums that were higher than those required from borrowers who did provide a down payment. With those higher premiums, Nehemiah's president wrote, "we might as well simply continue to offer the zero down payment option primarily through the down payment assistance industry". The bill did not become law. Similar bills were introduced in 2005, 2006 and 2007, but also did not become law.

The Internal Revenue Service ("IRS") took public action in 2005. In mid year, it released two private letter rulings, each of which described an organization that was conducting operations in a manner similar to the Nehemiah Program. Each ruling found that (i) the organization's operations did not exclusively serve a charitable purpose but, instead, served to promote "the private interests of home sellers and other private parties" and, consequently, (ii) the payments made by home sellers to the organization would not qualify as "charitable contributions" for which the seller could claim a tax deduction. And in November 2005, the Department of Justice filed suit in Chicago on behalf of the IRS, seeking an injunction against an Illinois-based seller-funded down-payment program. The injunction sought to bar that program from "falsely advising" home sellers that they could claim their payments to the program as charitable-contribution tax deductions. The IRS made its findings applicable to all seller-funded down-payment assistance programs when it issued a revenue ruling in May 2006. That ruling, Revenue Ruling 2006–27, contrasted the tax treatment of seller-funded programs with the treatment accorded to other types of down-payment assistance. Seller-funded programs, the ruling stated, were "not operated exclusively for charitable purposes". Furthermore, payments made by the seller to the organizations were to be treated not as charitable contributions, but either as rebates to the home buyer or as reductions in the sales price of the home. Shortly after the revenue ruling was issued, Nehemiah published an open letter from its president, in which it noted its opposition to the ruling but added that the ruling did not prevent the Nehemiah Program from continuing its operations. The letter did note, however, that Nehemiah might have to pay "appropriate business taxes on the revenue generated by its downpayment assistance program".

HUD tried again to implement a regulatory prohibition of seller-funded down payments when it re-proposed, in May 2007, its failed 1999 proposal. There were some 15,000 comments from the public, the majority of which were brief statements of opposition written "in a standard similar format and wording". While the period for public comment was still open, the Committee on Financial Services held a hearing on down payment assistance, a primary topic at which was the HUD proposal. Nehemiah's president gave testimony at this hearing, saying "mend it, don't end it" and, in a written statement, adding that the proposal "makes no sense as rational behavior or measured action". In October 2007, HUD pronounced its proposed change as "final", meaning that it now would be implemented, with an effective date of October 31, 2007. However, Nehemiah sued HUD in a federal district court, citing violations of the Administrative Procedure Act. In particular, Nehemiah alleged that (i) HUD failed to provide a "reasoned analysis" for its change in policy, (ii) HUD ignored reasonable alternatives (such as charging mortgage-insurance premiums that varied according to the risk of default), (iii) HUD relied on data that was not provided to the public, and (iv) HUD's secretary (Alphonso Jackson) had prejudged the outcome before all public comments had been received. At about the same time, another provider of seller-funded down-payment assistance (AmeriDream) filed a similar action in a different court. On October 31, that other court issued a temporary order barring HUD from implementing the regulation until a final disposition had been reached. The court in Nehemiah issued its final ruling in February 2008, finding that Nehemiah prevailed on some (but not all) of its allegations. The court ordered HUD to vacate the regulation.

Direct Congressional action came in April 2008 when the Senate passed the FHA Modernization Act of 2008. Section 2113 of the Act declared a seller-funded down payment to be a "prohibited source" of the minimum required down payment, and did so with wording that was identical to that used by HUD in its 2007 regulation. After being included as part of the Housing and Economic Recovery Act of 2008, it was signed into law on July 30, 2008. The prohibition of seller-funded down payments took effect on October 1, 2008.

=== Aftermath ===
One day after the Housing and Economic Recovery Act was signed into law, Representative Al Green of Texas introduced a bill that would have permitted the FHA to insure mortgage loans that had seller-funded down payments, so long as the home buyers had FICO credit scores that were above a specified minimum (but, in some cases, the buyers would have been assessed higher mortgage-insurance premiums by the FHA). Nehemiah supported this legislation and established a web site—the now-defunct dpagroundswell.org—that sought to generate public support through various means, including a letter-writing campaign to members of Congress. Although the bill succeeded in getting approval from the House Committee on Financial Services, it was never voted on by the entire House and, hence, did not become law. With this legislative failure, the seller-funded down-payment industry, including Nehemiah, ceased operations as of October 1, 2008. By that time, the Nehemiah Program had assisted over 300,000 home buyers with over $1 billion in down payments.

In December 2008, HUD complied with the orders in the Nehemiah and AmeriDream cases by formally vacating its 2007 regulation. By that time, a replacement regulation had already been proposed but, as of 2015, that replacement regulation has not been made final. In late 2012, HUD published an "interpretive rule" declaring that the statutory definition of a "prohibited source" of down-payment funds would not include governmental agencies.

In April 2012, an ex relatio complaint was filed in a federal District Court against five mortgage banks. Although Nehemiah was not a party to this complaint, the allegations related to the banks' treatment of Nehemiah-assisted down payments. In July 2014, the court dismissed the claim, citing a lack of subject-matter jurisdiction.

== Activities since 2008 ==
According to its website, the Nehemiah Corporation has been operating as a social enterprise organization composed of non-profit affiliates and for-profit subsidiaries. An undated description of the corporation on its web site lists two for-profit subsidiaries, only one of which (Nfinit Solutions) was still active as of 2015. Nfinit Solutions provides educational and foreclosure-relief services to homeowners.

As of 2015, the Nehemiah Corporation has maintained its status as a "public charity" under the rules of the Internal Revenue Service. Its financial report for fiscal year 2013 indicates that the corporation had assets of approximately $7 million. For that fiscal year, it reported expenses of slightly more than $200,000, of which $1,166 was for "grants and other assistance".

Also as of 2015, three affiliated entities have also maintained their statuses as "public charities": the Nehemiah Progressive Housing Development Corporation, the Nehemiah Community Reinvestment Fund, and the Nehemiah Community Foundation.

=== Nehemiah Progressive Housing Development Corporation ===
The 2013 financial statement for the Nehemiah Progressive Housing Development Corporation showed that it had no assets or revenue.

=== Nehemiah Community Reinvestment Fund ===
The Nehemiah Community Reinvestment Fund (NCRF) was founded in 1997. It provides funds (via loans and investment capital) to real-estate development projects intended to revitalize low income neighborhoods. As of the end of the 2013 fiscal year, the Fund had assets of approximately $11.0 million, about half of which were held in "program-related investments".

=== Nehemiah Community Foundation ===
The Nehemiah Community Foundation was founded in 2000 and provides grants to various individuals and non-profit and faith-based organizations. The Foundation developed a Wealth Empowerment Program, which provides instructional and other resources related to individual finance and home ownership. In 1997, the Foundation created, and is a co-sponsor of, the Nehemiah Emerging Leaders Program, which facilitates management training for young adults in the Sacramento area.

For the 2013 fiscal year, the Foundation reported expenses of slightly more than $250,000, of which $7,094 was for "grants and other assistance".
