= Isaac Berliner =

- יצחק בערלינער
- Born: September 7, 1899; Łódź, Congress Poland, Russian Empire
- Died: June 27, 1957; Mexico City, Mexico
- Occupations: Writer, Street Peddler, Forced Laborer
- Years active: 1917-1955
- Awards: Zvi Kessel Award

Isaac Berliner (Yiddish: יצחק בערלינער; Hebrew: יצחק ברלינר; September 7, 1899 – June 27, 1957) was a Mexican-Jewish writer. He was born in Łódź during WW1 he began writing, but moved to Mexico in 1922 where he became an important Mexican Jewish writer and social figure; he died in 1957.

== Biography ==
Isaac Berliner was born on September 7, 1899, in Łódź. He began writing in 1917 while working as a forced laborer after being impressed by the German Army. After emigrating to Mexico in 1922, he originally worked as a street peddler in the Mexican provinces before he moved to Mexico City. In Mexico City he became on the primary Mexican Jewish cultural figures through his writing of essays, stories, poems, and articles, which were published in Warsaw, New York City, Chicago, Toronto, Buenos Aires, Tel Aviv, and Mexico City. In 1955 he received the Zvi Kessel Prize for his book, Gezang fun mentsh. He died on June 27, 1957, in Mexico City.

Berliner's writing was influenced by that of fellow Łódź writer Moshe Bronderzon but his writing was more socially conscious with him frequently decrying rampant Mexican poverty.

== Bibliography ==
Shtot un palatsn (City and palaces) (Mexico, 1936)
Ad mosay (Until when?) (Mexico, 1941)
Toyt-symfanye (Death symphony) (Mexico, 1941)
Shtil zol zayn (It should be quiet) (Mexico, 1948)
Gezang fun mentsh (Song of man) (Mexico-New York, 1954)
