= Cora Berliner =

German economist

Cora Berliner

Cora Berliner (23 January 1890 — 1942) was a German economist and social scientist who was murdered by the Nazi regime. She was a pioneer of social work.

== Life ==
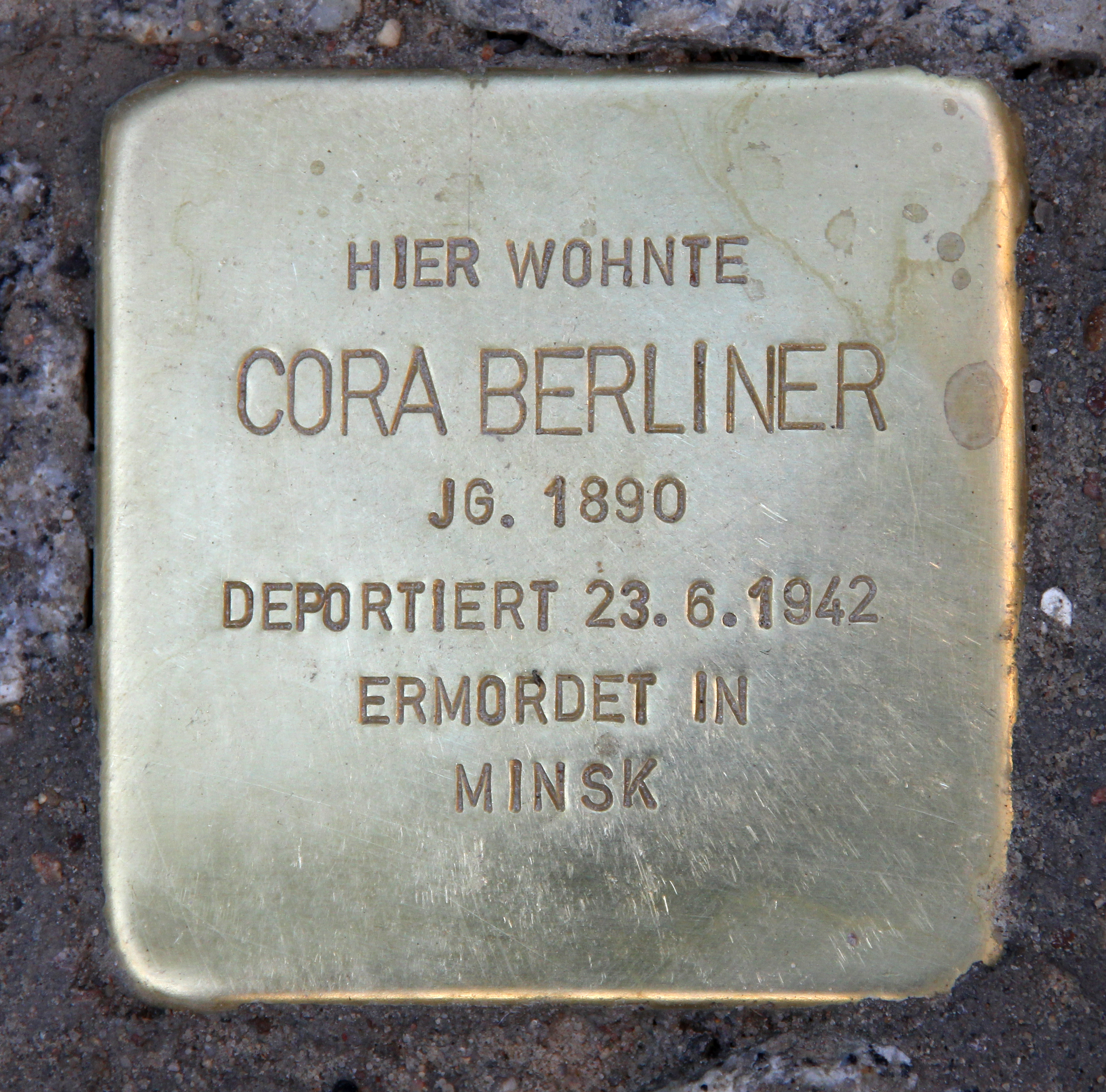
"Stolperstein" (stumbling block), Cora Berliner, Emser Straße 37, Berlin-Wilmersdorf, Germany

Born on born 23 January 1890, in Hanover, she was the fifth and youngest child of Jewish business training school director Manfred Berliner.

She had the customary education for girls of her class. After graduation as an external student of a boy's secondary school, she studied mathematics, political, and social science at the universities in Berlin and Heidelberg, graduating in 1916 with honors. The theme of her dissertation was "The organization of Jewish youth in Germany: a contribution to the classification of youth care and the youth movement." From 1919 she worked for the municipal government in Berlin-Schöneberg, and from 1910-1924 served as a deputy with the Association of Jewish Youth Clubs, for whom she later served as Business Manager and Executive Director in Heidelberg. There she lectured on the theme "The Social Clerk in the Municipality" in 1918. In 1919 she became a civil servant in the Economics Ministry, becoming a councillor in 1923 and of the leaders of the economics office in 1923.

In 1927 she went to London as a consultant to the economic department of the German embassy. In 1930 she became a professor of economics at the Business Teaching Institute in Berlin. In 1933 she lost her position in the civil service and became a compulsory member of the Reichsvereinigung der Juden in Deutschland, where she became the head of the department of emigration, a supervisor for teacher education, and deputy chairman of the Jewish Women's Federation. There, she pushed for the establishment of an institution for training (Jewish) kindergarten teachers. She also pushed for social reform and for social work as an academic discipline, in the model of Alice Salomon.

In the summer of 1939 Berliner visited Sweden in order to help the local Jewish leaders to negotiate with the Swedish authorities to admit more Jewish refugees from Nazi Germany and also to organize a refugee camp in Sweden. However, Berliner returned to her work in Germany before 25 July when her Swedish visa expired.

On 26 June 1942, together with other employees of the Reichsvereinigung, she was deported to Minsk. Little is known of her last days, but she was most likely murdered in the Maly Trostinets extermination camp. A memorial stone commemorates her life at the Jewish Cemetery in Hannover. Some of her papers are included in the Ida-Seele-Archive.

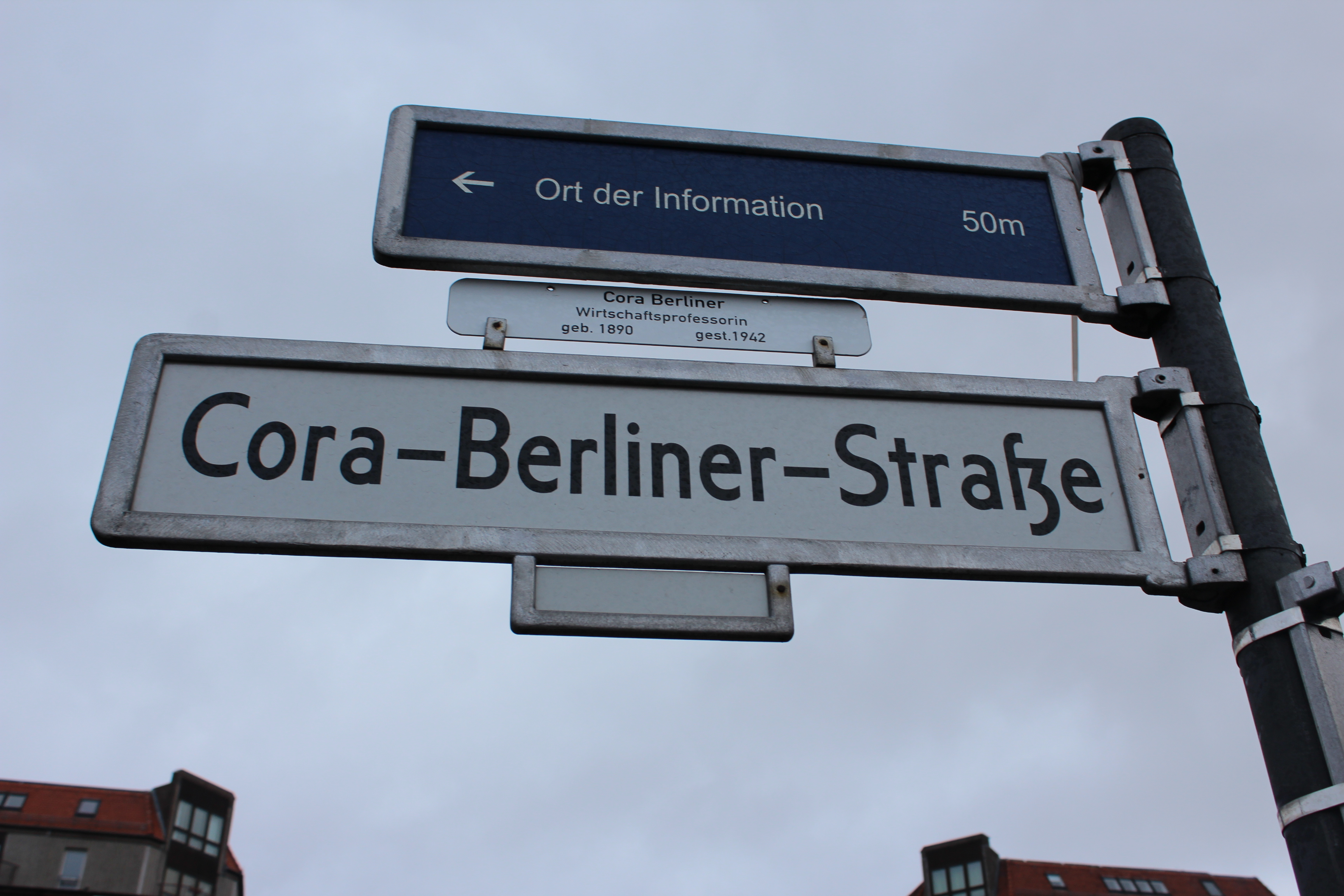
Cora Berliner Street, Berlin, Germany

A street near the Holocaust memorial in Berlin-Mitte is named after her, as is a footpath between the Hannover Opera house and the Hannover Holocaust memorial.

Cora never married and had no children, but was survived by several relatives, including 21 grandnephews/nieces, who are currently living in the US.

== Writings ==
- The Organization of the Jewish Youth in Germany: a Contribution to the Classification of Jewish Aid and Jewish Movements. Online Version
- Women's Emigration, in "Jewish News" 1939, Nr. 56 (July 14, 1939, pg. 2). Online version

== Bibliography ==
- Hugo Maier (ed:) Who is who der Sozialen Arbeit, Freiburg im Breisgau : Lambertus 1998 ISBN 3-7841-1036-3
- M. Berger: Wer war... Cora Berliner?, in: Sozialmagazin, 24, 1999, pg. 6 ff.
- Sibylle Quack: Cora Berliner, Gertrud Kolmar, Hannah Arendt. Straßen am „Denkmal für die ermordeten Juden Europas“ ehren ihr Andenken. Hentrich: Berlin 2005 ISBN 3-938485-12-4
