= Benjamin Consolo =

Italian writer

Benjamin Consolo (Italian: Beniamino Consolo; 1806–1887) was an Italian Hebrew writer and translator. Consolo was born in Ancona, where he studied at the Talmud Torah under the instruction of Rabbi David A. Vivant. He studied Italian with Count Pietro Alety, a student of Dante, and then Latin with Lorenzo Barili. He was appointed secretary of the Jewish community at Ancona, and later of that at Florence, where he began translating Hebrew works into Italian.

Consolo's works include: I Capitoli dei Padri, Trattato Misnico Morale con Commenti, an Italian translation of Abot; I Doveri de' Cuori (Prato, 1847); Volgarizzamento del Libro di Job (Florence, 1874); Volgarizzamento delle Lamentazioni di Geremi; and Il Salterio o Canti Nazionali del Popolo d'Israele Spiegati e Commentati (Florence, 1885). He was also the author of several shorter essays and poems, and published a translation of "The Duties of the Heart", an eleventh century moral treatise by Maestro Bechai originally written in Arabic and translated into Hebrew by Judah ben Tibon.

His wife, Regine, published an Italian translation of the Enchiridion d'Egitto. The composer and virtuoso Federico Consolo was his son.
