= Nehemiah Samuel Libowitz =

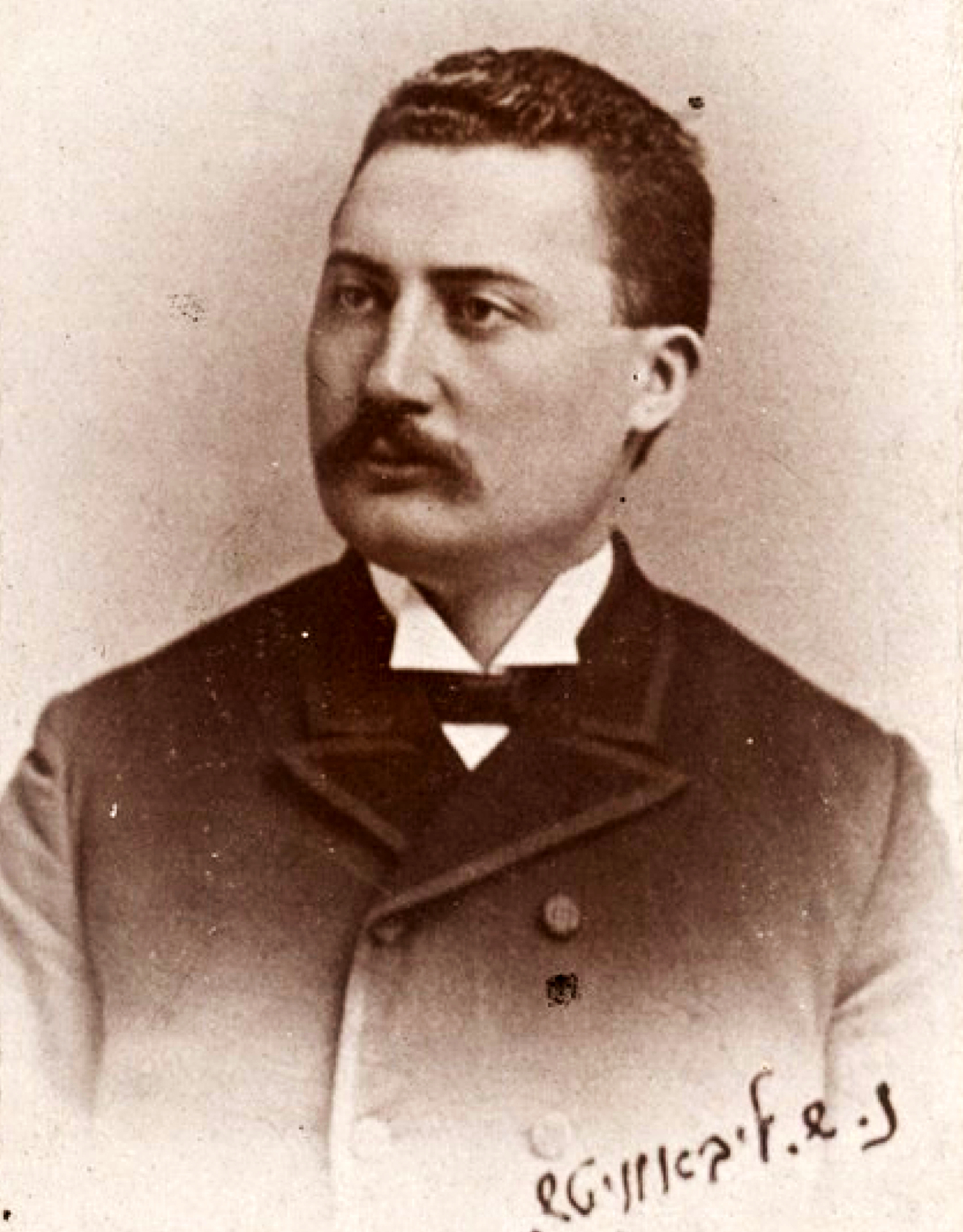
Nehemiah Samuel Libowitz

Nehemiah Samuel Libowitz (Hebrew: נחמיה שמואל ליבוביץ; January 3, 1862 – June 12, 1939) was a Polish-American Hebrew scholar and author. Born in Kolno, he studied Talmud under Rabbi Elijah Chasid and then under his own father, Isaac Libowitz; in addition he devoted himself to Hebrew literature, reading especially works on criticism.

In 1881, he immigrated to the United States and settled in New York, where he split his time between business and literature.

== Publications ==
Libowitz is the author of:

- Iggeret Bikkoret (New York, 1895), against I. H. Weiss;
- Rabbi Yehudah Aryeh Modena (Vienna, 1896; 2d ed., New York, 1901), his most important work, a collection of materials for a biography of Leon of Modena;
- Ephraim Deinard (ib. 1901), a harsh criticism of Deinard; and several other pamphlets.

Libowitz has also contributed to the Hebrew periodicals in the United States: Ner Ma'arabi, Ha-Modia' lachadashim, and Yalkut Ma'arabi.
