= Orzeł Kolno =

Polish football club

- Full name: Koleński Klub Sportowy; Orzeł Kolno
- Founded: 1929
- Ground: Stadion Miejski, Wojska Polskiego 40 Street , Kolno, Poland
- Capacity: 2000
- Chairman: (Poland) Andrzej Kozikowski
- Manager: (Poland) Ryszard Borkowski
- League: IV liga
- Website: http://orzelkolno.futbolowo.pl/
Home colours	Away colours

Orzeł Kolno is a Polish football club based in Kolno. The club is currently playing in III Liga (4th level).

== Achievements ==
- one season in Poland III Liga - season 1963/1964
- The Polish Cup on Voivodship area 1980/1981 (regional qualification)
