= Herman A. Berliner =

American economist

Herman Albert Berliner (born April 6, 1944) was the Provost and Senior Vice President for Academic Affairs of Hofstra University. He was appointed provost of Hofstra University in 1990 and served as Provost for 28 years in total. He also served as Business School Dean and Interim Dean for 12 years in total.

== Beginnings ==
Berliner's first post at Hofstra University in 1970 was as an assistant professor of economics, subsequent to completing his Ph.D. in economics at City University of New York Graduate School. He was awarded tenure in 1975, promoted to associate professor in 1978 and to professor in 1985. Beginning in 1994 he was also appointed as the Lawrence Herbert Distinguished Professor

== Posts held ==
Berliner has held a number of administrative positions, including:

- Senior Vice President for Academic Affairs (2002–2015, 2019–2021)
- Provost (1990–2015, 2019–2021)
- Acting Provost and Dean of Faculties (1989–1990)
- Dean of faculties (1990–2002)
- Dean of the School of Business (1983–1989, 2015–2019)
- Acting dean of the School of Education (1983–1984)
- Interim dean of the School of Business (1980–1982)
- Associate provost and associate dean of faculties (1978–1983)
- Assistant provost (1976–1977)
- Associate dean of University Advisement (1975–1976)

== Conferences ==
Berliner has overseen conferences at Hofstra, including:

- Hofstra University's 50th Anniversary Celebration
- "Higher Education Today and Tomorrow"
- "The Evolution of Education in Collegiate Schools of Business: Past, Present and Future"
- "Chocolate: Food of the Gods"
- "Money: Lure, Lore and Liquidity"

== Specialty ==
Berliner's areas of specialty include the economics of higher education. As of 2009, he is a TIAA/CREF Fellow, and he has served as an associate editor of The American Economist. Dr. Berliner also served as president of the North Shore Board of Education. In addition, he is known for his large collection of over 500 dreidels that have been displayed in museum exhibitions.
