= August Berlin =

German politician (1910–1981)

Member of the Bundestag
- In office 7 September 1949 – 22 September 1972

Personal details
- Born: 2 February 1910 Brake / Krs. Lemgo
- Died: 11 July 1981 (aged 71)
- Party: SPD

August Berlin (2 February 1910 – 11 July 1981) was a German politician of the Social Democratic Party (SPD) and former member of the German Bundestag.

== Life ==
He was a member of the German Bundestag from its first election in 1949 to 1972, and was always directly elected in the constituency of Detmold (since 1965 Detmold - Lippe).

== Literature ==
Herbst, Ludolf; Jahn, Bruno (2002). Vierhaus, Rudolf (ed.). Biographisches Handbuch der Mitglieder des Deutschen Bundestages. 1949–2002 [Biographical Handbook of the Members of the German Bundestag. 1949–2002] (in German). München: De Gruyter - De Gruyter Saur. p. 1715. ISBN 978-3-11-184511-1.
