= Orao =

Orao ("eagle" in Serbo-Croatian) may refer to:

- Soko J-22 Orao, a Yugoslav-Romanian combat aircraft
- The Yugoslav Orao-class minelayers
- Orao (computer)
- The Kurukh people, also called Oṛāō^{n}
