= Russian frigate Oryol (1985) =

Krivak-class frigate

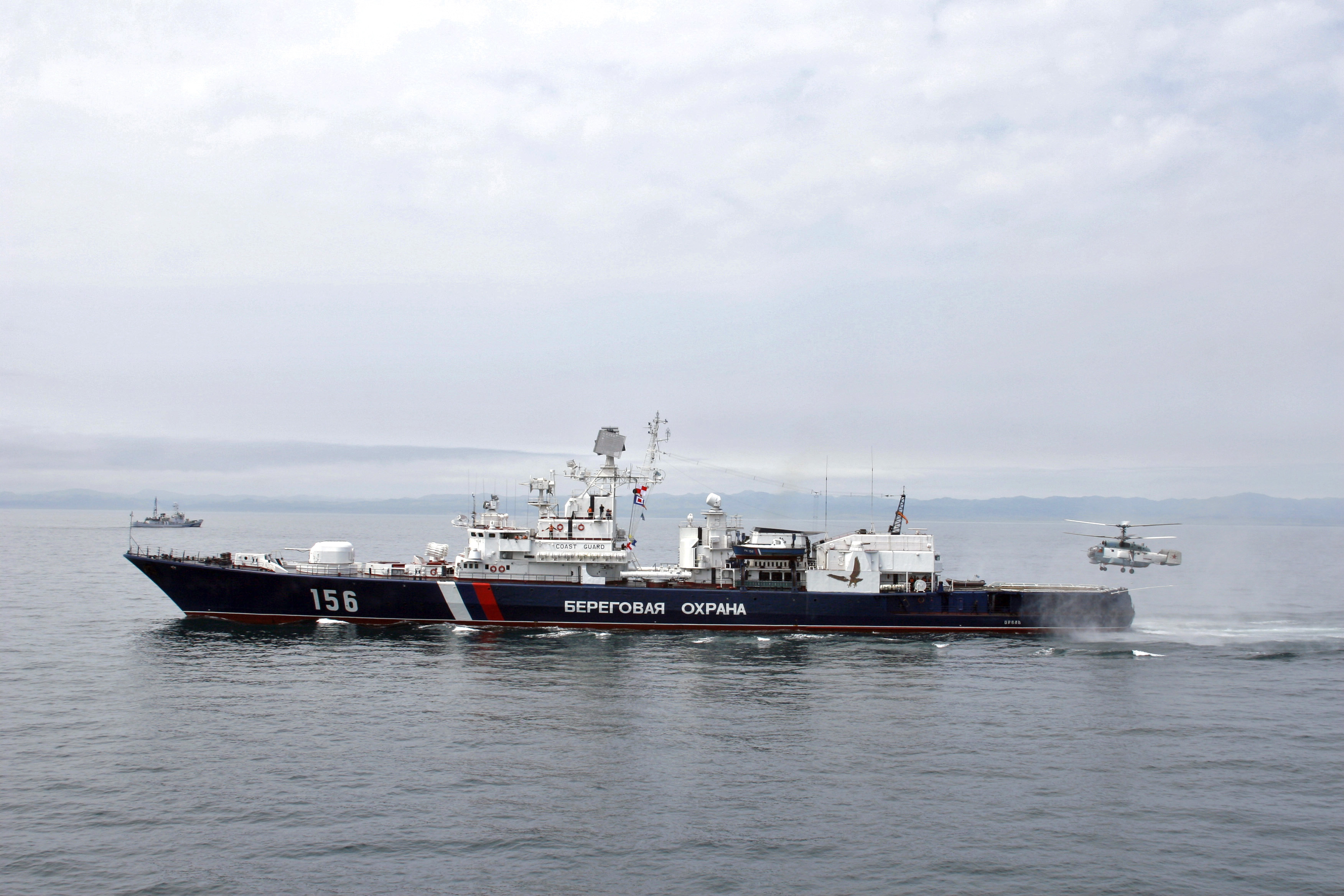
- The Russian frigate Oryol and the Japanese patrol vessel Shiretoko (background) during the Russian-Japanese exercise in Aniva Bay in 2009

History

→ Soviet Union → Russia
- Name: Imeni XXVII siezda KPSS
- Renamed: Oryol
- Namesake: 27th Congress of the Communist Party of the Soviet Union; City of Oryol
- Builder: Zaliv Shipyard, Kerch
- Yard number: 203
- Laid down: 26 September 1983
- Launched: 2 November 1985 (as Yuri Andropov)
- Commissioned: 30 September 1986
- Decommissioned: November 2019
- Status: In reserve as 2021

General characteristics
- Class & type: Krivak III-class frigate
- Displacement: 3,180 t (3,130 long tons) (standard); 3,670 t (3,610 long tons) (full)
- Length: 123 m (403 ft 7 in)
- Beam: 14.2 m (46 ft 7 in)
- Draught: 5 m (16 ft 5 in)
- Installed power: 63,000 shp (47,000 kW)
- Propulsion: 4 gas turbines; COGAG; 2 shafts
- Speed: 32 kn (59 km/h)
- Range: 3,900 nmi (7,223 km) at 14 kn (26 km/h)
- Complement: 192
- Sensors & processing systems: MR-760 Fregat-MA air/surface search radar; Vaigach-Nayada navigational radar; MR-184 Lev fire control radar; Vympel-A fire control radar; MGK-335S Platina-S sonar; MG-345 Bronza towed sonar
- Electronic warfare & decoys: MP-401 Start ESM; PK-16 and PK-10 chaff launchers
- Armament: 2 × twin ZIF-122 4K33 launchers with 20 × 4K33 Osa-M (SA-N-4 Gecko) SAMs; 1 × 100 mm (3.9 in) AK-100 gun; 2 × 30 mm AK-630M CIWS; 2 × RBU-6000 Smerch-2 anti-submarine rockets; 2 × quadruple 533 mm (21 in) torpedo tubes; 16 × naval mines
- Aircraft carried: 1 × Kamov Ka-27PS
- Aviation facilities: Helipad and hangar

Oryol (Russian: Орёл, lit. 'Eagle'; also Orel) is a Project 11351 Nerey-class frigate (NATO reporting name Krivak III class) of the Coast Guard of the FSB Border Service of Russia. Previously the ship served in the KGB Border Troops Naval Service as Imeni XXVII siezda KPSS (Имени XXVII съезда КПСС).

== Design and description ==
Oryol was one of nine Project 11351 ships launched between 1982 and 1992. Project 11351, the Nerey (Russian: Нерей, lit. 'Nereus') class, was the patrol version of the Project 1135 Burevestnik for the Soviet Maritime Border Troops. The ships were designated Border Patrol Ship (пограничный сторожевой корабль, PSKR) to reflect their role as patrol ships of the Border Troops. In comparison to other members of the class, Project 11351 ships has a helipad and hangar for a Kamov Ka-27PS search-and-rescue helicopter astern, in exchange to losing one 100 mm gun, one twin-arm surface-to-air missile launcher and the URPK-5 Rastrub (SS-N-14 Silex) anti-ship missile launchers. NATO classified the vessels as Krivak III-class frigates.

Oryol is 123 m (403 ft 7 in) long overall, with a beam of 14.2 m (46 ft 7 in) and a draught of 5 m (16 ft 5 in). Displacing 3,180 t (3,130 long tons) standard and 3,670 t (3,610 long tons) full load, the ship's power is provided by two 22,500 shp (16,800 kW) DT59 and two 9,000 shp (6,700 kW) DS71 gas turbines arranged in a COGAG installation, driving two fixed-pitch propellers. Design speed was 32 knots (59 km/h; 37 mph) and range 3,900 nautical miles (7,223 km; 4,488 mi) at 14 kn (26 km/h; 16 mph). The ship's complement is 192, including 31 officers.

== Armament and sensors ==
Oryol is armed with one 100 mm (3.9 in) AK-100 gun mounted forward of the bridge and two AK-630M close-in weapon system autocannons mounted on each side of the helicopter hangar. Defence against aircraft was provided by twenty 4K33 OSA-M (SA-N-4 Gecko) surface-to-air missiles which were launched from one set of twin-arm ZIF-122 launchers, mounted aft of the fore 100 mm gun. For anti-submarine warfare, the ship are equipped with a pair of 12-barrel 213 mm (8.4 in) RBU-6000 Smerch-2 anti-submarine rocket launchers and a pair of PTA-53-1135 quadruple launchers for 533 mm (21 in) torpedoes, consisted of either 53-65K wake homing torpedo or SET-65 anti-submarine homing torpedo. The ship can also carry 16 naval mines.

The ship sensor suites includes Sapfir-U7 combat management system, a single MR-760 Fregat-MA air/surface search radar, one Vaigach-Nayada navigation radar, and the MP-401 Start Electronic Support Measures (ESM) system. Fire control for the guns consisted of MR-184 Lev radar for the 100 mm gun and Vympel-A radar for the 30 mm autocannons. An extensive sonar complex was fitted, including the bow-mounted MGK-335S Platina-S and the towed-array MG-345 Bronza. The vessel was also equipped with two PK-16 and two PK-10 decoy-dispenser system which used chaff as a form of missile defense.

== Construction and career ==
The frigate was the third ship of the class. The keel was laid on 26 September 1983 with yard number 203 at the Zaliv Shipyard in Kerch. The ship, initially named Yuri Andropov (Юрий Андропов), was launched on 2 November 1985. The ship was renamed to Imeni XXVII siezda KPSS ('Named after 27th Congress of the CPSU') on 7 March 1986. The vessel was commissioned on 30 September 1986.

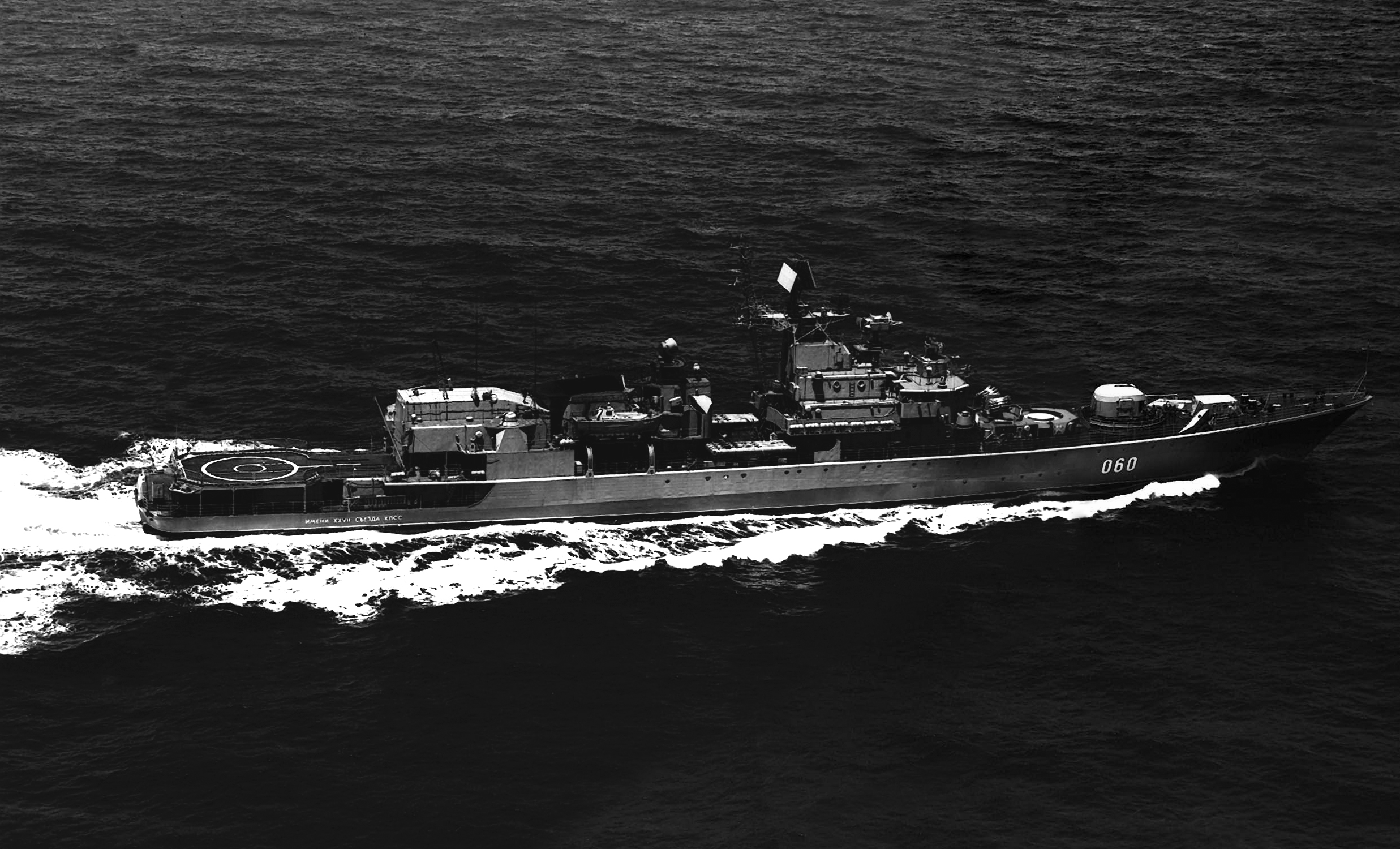
Imeni XXVII siezda KPSS underway on 1 March 1987

The ship was assigned to the 16th Sakhalinskaya Red Banner Separate Brigade of Border Patrol Ships in Nakhodka, part of the Pacific Border District. From 10 February to 25 March 1987, Imeni XXVII siezda KPSS sailed from Sevastopol to its assigned homeport in Nakhodka via Suez Canal. The ship begun its first patrol duty on 30 April. In 1990, the ship and its crew starred in the 1991 Soviet action film Charged with Death (Заряженные смертью) as "PSKR Yuri Andropov".

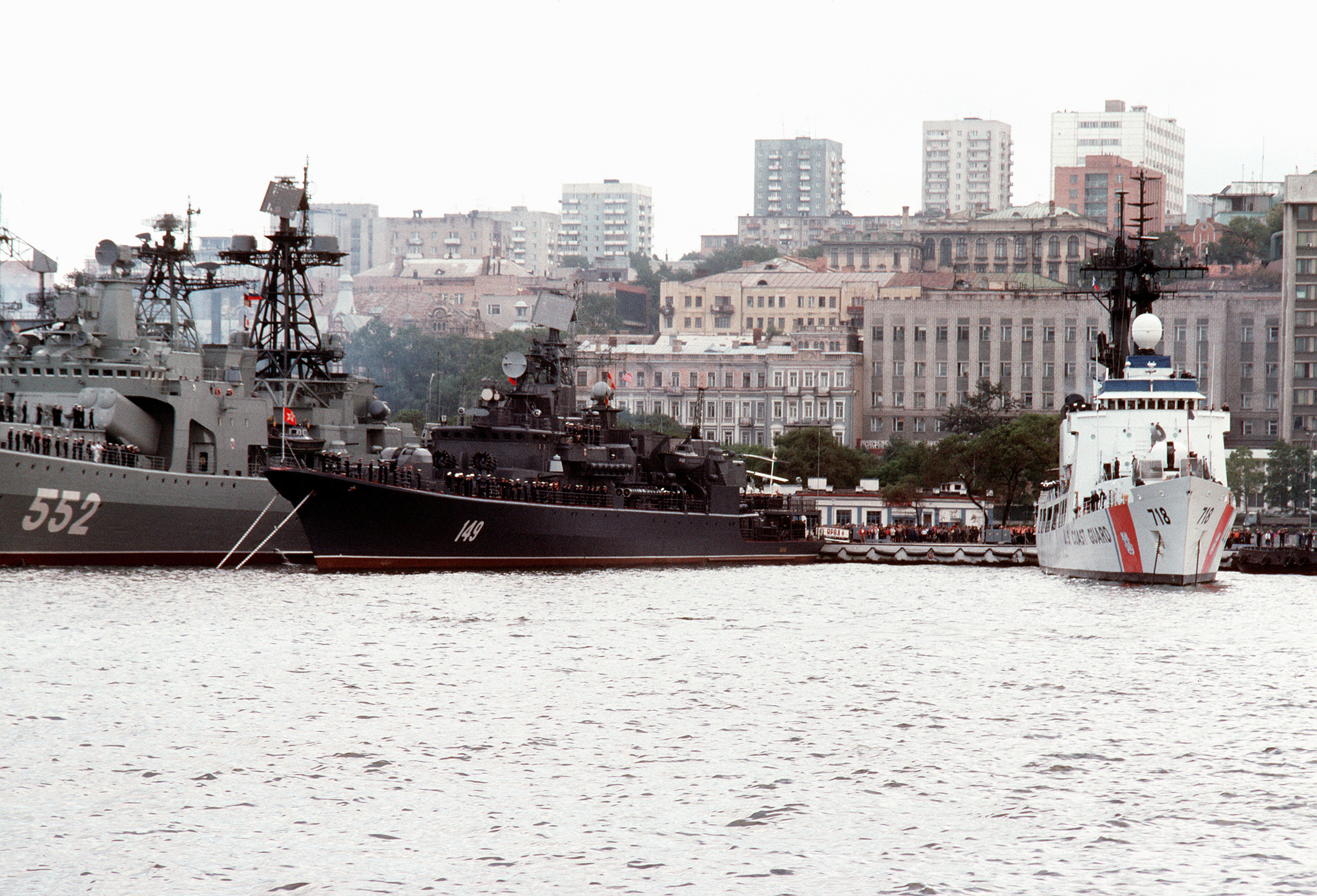
Oryol (center) moored alongside Admiral Tributs (left) and USCGC Chase (right) in Vladivostok on 23 September 1992

Upon the dissolution of the Soviet Union in December 1991, the ship was retained by Russia and the Maritime Border Forces of the Russian Federation inherited it. The ship underwent long-term maintenance in Vladivostok from 1992 to 1999. In the meantime, the frigate was renamed to Oryol on 1 December 1993. The ship resumed patrol again off the Russian Far East in June 1999.

On 9 October 2001, Oryol was transferred to Petropavlovsk-Kamchatsky. By 14 April 2002, the ship started patrolling the waters off Northeastern Russia. The ship concluded an Agreement on Friendship and Cooperation with Oryol municipal government in May 2002. Oryol participated in large-scale exercise of the Pacific Fleet on 18–28 August 2003. The ship and its crew was awarded with "Excellent" rating for its task during the exercise. The ship celebrated its 30th anniversary in November 2016, which was attended by delegation from City of Oryol officials.

Oryol last seen active service in December 2018, then the ship was put into reserve fleet. The vessel sailed again in spring 2019 and attended the Russian Navy Day in July. Finally Oryol was decommissioned and put into reserve again in November 2019.

In March 2021, a commission from the Ministry of Defence visited the ship, moored in Petropavlovsk-Kamchatsky, to inspect its technical condition. According to a source from Russian navy, Oryol was planned to be transferred to the Russian Navy, as the ship is already 34-years old when it was decommissioned. The coast guard would replace the frigate with new Okean-class patrol ship. Oryol has not been drydocked since 2014, so the ship would have to be drydocked to assess its seaworthiness. The navy would either assign Oryol to the Black Sea Fleet or cannibalized the ship for spare parts supply for the Pacific Fleet.
