= Oryol electoral district =

Constituency of the Russian Republic

Oryol
- Former Civilian constituency for the All-Russian Constituent Assembly
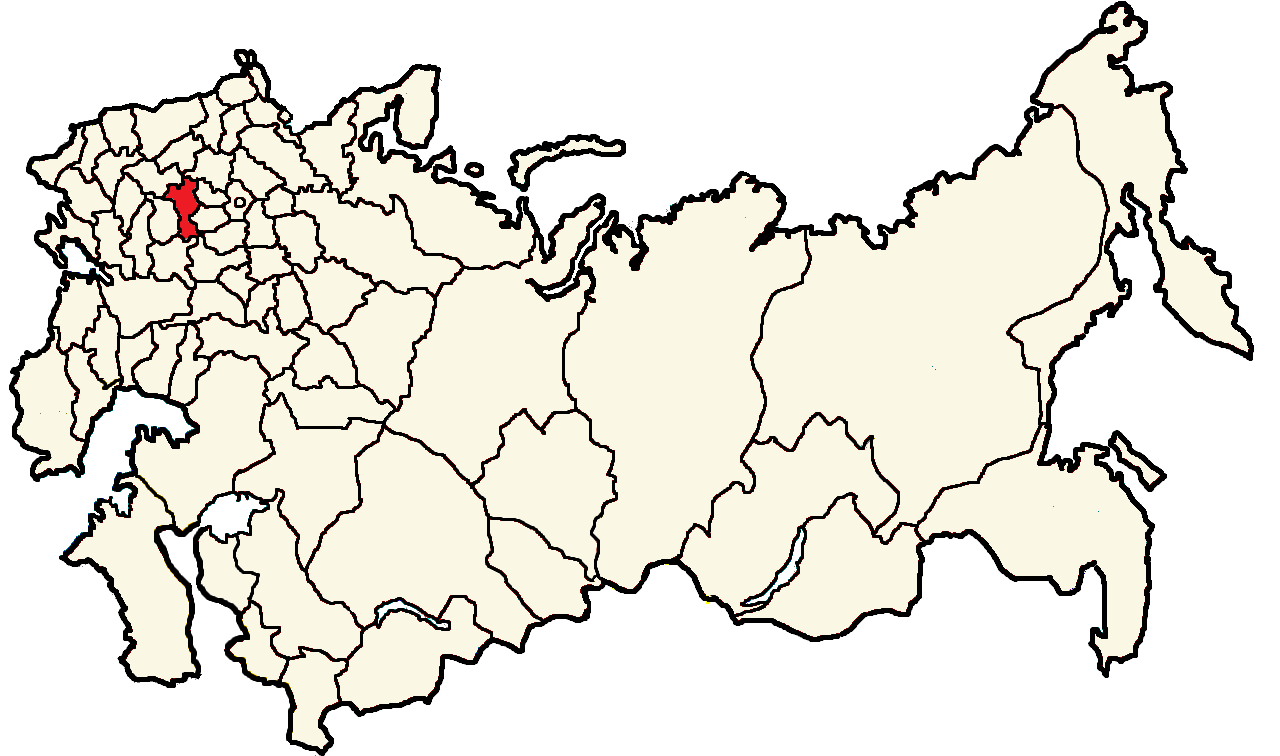

Former constituency
- Created: 1917
- Abolished: 1918
- Number of members: 12
- Number of Uyezd Electoral Commissions: 12
- Number of Urban Electoral Commissions: 4
- Number of Parishes: 201

The Oryol electoral district (Russian: Орловский избирательный округ) was a constituency created for the 1917 Russian Constituent Assembly election.

The electoral district covered the Oryol Governorate. The Kraiskovo electoral commission chair was killed by soldiers at the time of the election.

== Results ==
Oryol
Party	Vote	%	Seats
List 3 - Socialist-Revolutionaries and Soviet of Peasants Deputies	511,049	62.70	8
List 8 - Bolsheviks	241,786	29.66	4
List 2 - Kadets	18,345	2.25	
List 5 - Mensheviks	16,301	2.00	
List 6 - Union of Landowners	12,911	1.58	
List 4 - Commercial-Industrial Union	4,462	0.55	
List 7 - Unity, Cooperators and Popular Socialists	1,384	0.17	
List 1 - Union of Homeowners	438	0.05	
Unaccounted	8,453	1.04	
Total:	815,129		12

Deputies Elected
Bukin	SR
Goncharov	SR
Khodotov	SR
Maslov	SR
Matveevskaya	SR
Vladykin	SR
Volnov	SR
Volodin	SR
Andreev	Bolshevik
Fokin	Bolshevik
Ivanov	Bolshevik
Kuznetsov	Bolshevik
