= Nachmani =

Nachmani is a surname. Notable people with the surname include:

- Eden Nachmani (born 1990), Israeli footballer
- Omer Nachmani (born 1993), Israeli footballer
- Stav Nachmani (born 2002), Israeli footballer
