= Orel (Chrudim District) =

- Municipality
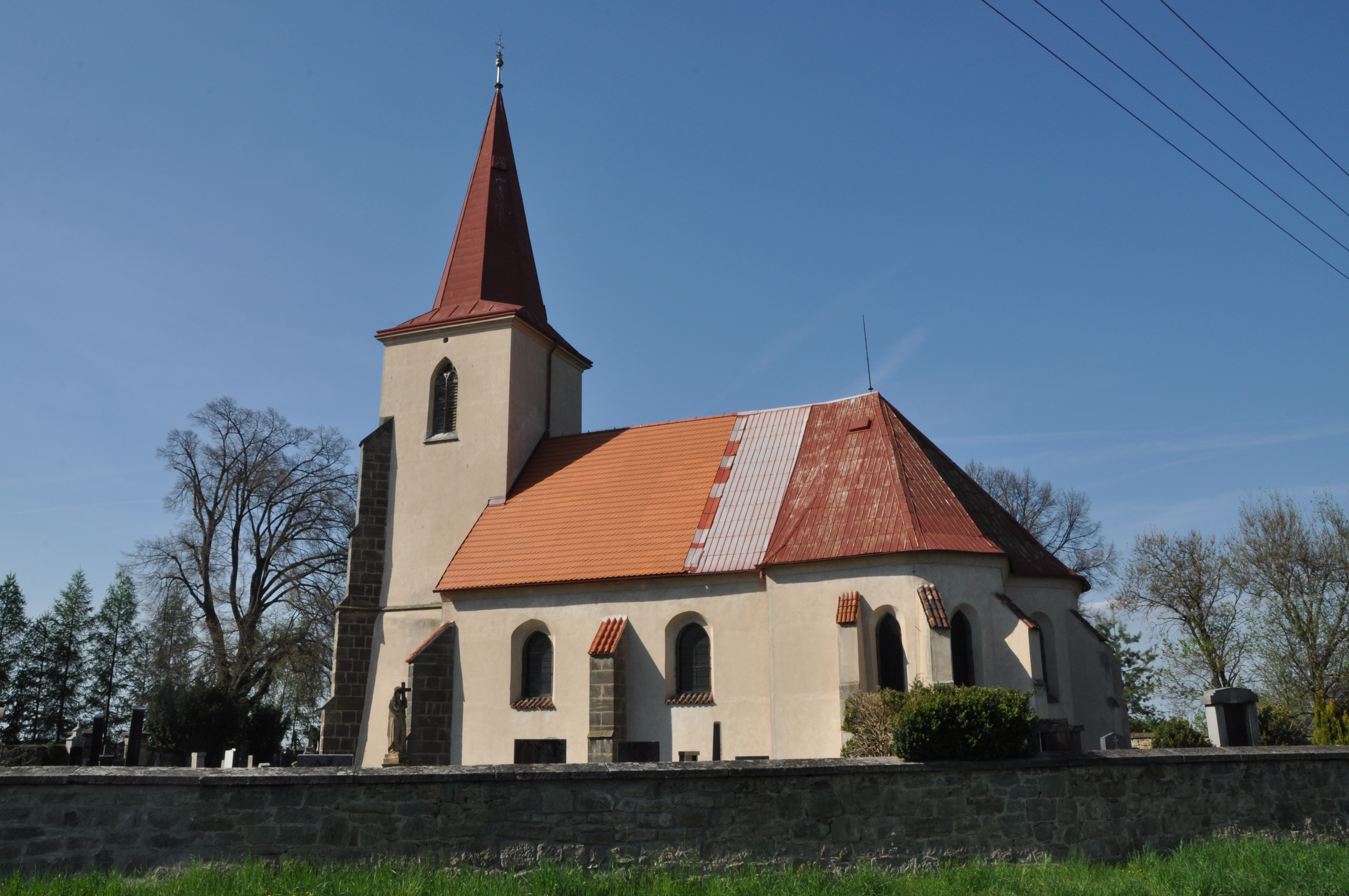
- Church of Saint George

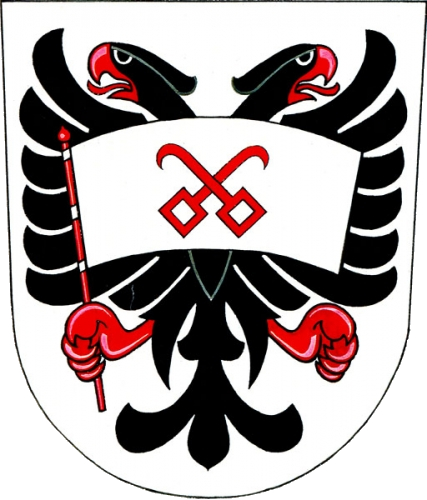
- Flag Coat of arms

- Location in the Czech Republic
- Coordinates: 49°55′10″N 15°50′21″E
- Country: Czech Republic
- Region: Pardubice
- District: Chrudim
- First mentioned: 1360

Area
  - Total: 6.44 km^{2} (2.49 sq mi)
- Elevation: 275 m (902 ft)

Population (2026-01-01)
  - Total: 809
  - Density: 126/km^{2} (325/sq mi)
- Time zone: UTC+1 (CET)
  - Summer (DST): UTC+2 (CEST)
- Postal codes: 537 01, 538 21
- Website: www.obecorel.cz

Orel is a municipality and village in Chrudim District in the Pardubice Region of the Czech Republic. It has about 800 inhabitants.

== Administrative division ==
Orel consists of two municipal parts (in brackets population according to the 2021 census):

- Orel (769)
- Tři Bubny (2)

== Demographics ==
Historical population
Year	Pop.	±%
1869	564	—
1880	601	+6.6%
1890	737	+22.6%
1900	811	+10.0%
1910	929	+14.5%
1921	869	−6.5%
1930	890	+2.4%
1950	814	−8.5%
1961	817	+0.4%
1970	741	−9.3%
1980	710	−4.2%
1991	658	−7.3%
2001	689	+4.7%
2011	737	+7.0%
2021	771	+4.6%
Source: Censuses
