= Orel (name) =

Orel is a given name and a surname of multiple origins. Of various meanings, the word means 'eagle' in some Slavic languages; as a Hebrew first name (אוראל) it means Light of God. Notable people with the name include:

== Given name ==
- Orel Baye
- Orel Busby, American lawyer
- Orel Dgani, Israeli professional footballer
- Orel Grinfeld, Israeli football referee
- Orel Hershiser (born 1958), American baseball pitcher
- Orel Mangala (born 1998), Belgian footballer
- Orel Oral, Turkish swimmer
- Orel Viciani, Chilean politician

== Surname ==
- Ahmet Örel, Turkish freestyle wrestler
- Alenka Orel, Slovenian sports sailor
- Alfred Orel (1889–1967), Austrian musicologist
- Ann Orel
- Anna Maria Orel, Estonian hammer thrower
- Janja Orel, Slovenian sports sailor
- Viktoria Orel, Ukrainian model and beauty pageant titleholder
- Vyacheslav Orel

== Fictional characters ==
- Dr. Orel Benton, a character in the Christmas fantasy drama film Prancer
- Orel Puppington, the titular protagonist of the TV show Moral Orel
