= Mark Berliner =

American statistician

L. Mark Berliner
- Born: 1951 (age 74–75)
- Education: Purdue University
- Scientific career
- Fields: Statistics
- Workplaces: Ohio State University
- Thesis: Estimation in a Statistical Control Problem (1980)
- Doctoral advisor: Jim Berger

Lloyd Mark Berliner (born 1951) is an American statistician interested in Bayesian analysis in complex settings and geophysical problems, and formerly Bayesian statistics, decision theory and Bayesian analysis. He is a professor emeritus in residence at Ohio State University and an Elected Fellow of the American Association for the Advancement of Science, American Statistical Association, and Institute of Mathematical Statistics.
