= David Berliner (anthropologist) =

Belgian anthropologist

David Berliner (born 16 February 1976) is a Belgian anthropologist and a professor of anthropology at the Université libre de Bruxelles, Belgium.

== Academic career ==
Born in Brussels, Berliner holds a PhD in Social and Cultural Anthropology from Université Libre de Bruxelles, completed in 2002. Before completing his Ph.D., Berliner was a doctoral visiting student at The University of Manchester and Oxford University. From 2001 to 2003, he completed a postdoctoral fellowship at Harvard University, and has taught at the Central European University. Between 2011 and 2015, he was coeditor of Social Anthropology/Anthropologie Sociale, the journal of the European Association of Social Anthropologists. He has held invited professorships at Ecole des hautes etudes en sciences sociales (in 2017) and at Université de Toulouse II – Le Mirail (in 2010). In 2025, he received the prestigious title of Professeur de Recherches Francqui.

He mostly writes about memory, nostalgia (exonostalgia)., temporality, heritage, transmission and cultural loss, but also religion, gender and sexuality. Influenced by Lévi-Strauss, William James, Georges Perec and Donna Haraway, he pursues the project of an anthropology rooted in solid, "thick" empiricism and balancing smoothly between hermeneutical understanding and scientific modes of explanation; an anthropology that is capable of accounting for the ways individuals "arrive at" cultural concepts, representations, practices and emotions. This implies an intellectual commitment to issues of learning, transmission and socialization, and interdisciplinary connections with cognitive psychology, psychoanalysis, linguistics and fiction.

His main areas of geographic experience are West Africa and Southeast Asia. He has conducted ethnographic research in Guinea Conakry, Burkina Faso, Gabon and, more recently in Laos, Romania and Belgium. He has recently begun researching digital immersions and, in particular, communities of social virtual reality (SVR) users

Berliner has published blog posts aimed at popularising anthropology. He is a frequent contributor of newspapers pieces in Belgium and France. He has also written about the neoliberal ethos in contemporary academia.

His book "Perdre sa culture" (éditions Zones Sensibles) has been awarded the Prix Scam Essai 2019.

In 2022, David Berliner has announced that he published a series of short fiction pieces under the pseudonym Derek Moss, for example "An anthropologist for dinner" https://culanth.org/fieldsights/an-anthropologist-for-dinner and "A desire for traces" https://www.otherwisemag.com/traces.

== Selected publications ==
2025. (with Mariia Erofeeva). Becoming otter: Avatars and the crafting of the self in social virtual reality. Journal of Material Culture. https://doi.org/10.1177/13591835251377583

2024. Becoming Other. Heterogeneity and Plascticity of the Self. Oxford/New York: Berghahn Books.

2022 Devenir Autre. Hétérogénéité et plasticité du soi. Paris: Editions La Découverte.

2020 (with Olivia Angé) Ecological Nostalgias: Memory, Affect and Creativity in Times of Ecological Upheavals. London/New York: Berghahn Books.

2020 Losing Culture. Heritage, nostalgia and Our Accelerated Times. New Brunswick : Rutgers University Press.

2018 Perdre sa culture. Bruxelles : Editions Zones Sensibles.

2016 (with Christoph Brumann) World Heritage on the Ground. Ethnographical Perspectives. London/New York: Berghahn Books.

2014 (with Olivia Angé) Anthropology and Nostalgia. London/New York : Berghahn Books.

2013 Mémoires religieuses Baga. Paris : Somogy.

2013 (with Mattjis Van de Port and Laurent Legrain). Latour and the Anthropology of the Moderns. Social Anthropology/Anthropologie Sociale 21(4): 435–447.

2012 Multiple Nostalgias : the Fabric of Heritage in Luang Prabang (Lao PDR). JRAI 18(4): 769–786.

2008 (with Douglas Falen). Speaking of Women: Men Doing Anthropology of Women. Men and Masculinities 11. Special issue.

2007 (with Ramon Sarro). Learning Religion: Anthropological Approaches. Oxford/NY : Berghahn Books.

2005 An « Impossible » Transmission. Youth Religious Memories in Guinea-Conakry. American Ethnologist 32(4): 576–592.

2005 The Abuses of Memory. Reflections on the Memory Boom in Anthropology. Anthropological Quarterly 78(1): 183–197.
