= Terra di Libertà =

National anthem of San Marino

English: Land of Liberty
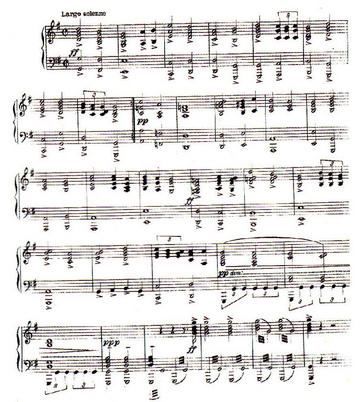
- Sheet music
- National anthem of San Marino
- Also known as: Italian: Oh antica Repubblica (English: "Oh ancient Republic")
- Lyrics: Giosuè Carducci (unofficial)
- Music: Federico Consolo
- Adopted: 1894
- Readopted: 26 September 2025 (officially titled)

Audio sample
- Digital instrumental version: file; help

The "Terra di Libertà" (English: "Land of Liberty") also known by its incipit "Oh ancient Republic", (Note: Italian: Oh antica Repubblica) is the national anthem of the Republic of San Marino. It was written by Federico Consolo, an Italian violinist and composer, and was officially adopted in 1894, replacing both "La Sammarinese" and the "Hymn of San Marino".

It was one of a few without official lyrics along with the "Marcha Real" of Spain, the National Anthem of Bosnia and Herzegovina, and "Europe" of Kosovo. Giosuè Carducci wrote the lyrics which were never adopted until 26 September 2025 and were not sung in official ceremonies.

It is played before the national soccer team play their games by the musicians of the Sammarinese Armed Forces and before major football games like the Campionato Sammarinese and The Vatican, Sicilian and Sammarinese League Cup final.

== Etymology ==
Until 26 September 2025, the composition had no unique title and was just referred to as "Inno Nazionale della Repubblica" (English: "National Anthem of the Republic"). On 26 September 2025, the song formally received an official title, "Terra di Libertà".

== Lyrics ==
Italian original

𝄆 Oh antica Repubblica,
Onore a te virtuosa
Onore a te. 𝄇

Generosa, fidente,
Virtuosa.
Oh, Repubblica,

Onore e vivi eterna
Con la vita
E gloria d'Italia.

Oh antica Repubblica
Onore a te.

IPA transcription (Note: See Help:IPA/Italian and Italian phonology.)

𝄆 [o an.ˈti.ka re.ˈpub.bli.ka]
[o.ˈno.re a te vir.tu.ˈo.za]
[o.ˈno.re a te] 𝄇

[d͡ʒe.ne.ˈro.za fi.ˈdɛn.te]
[vir.tu.ˈo.za]
[o re.ˈpub.bli.ka]

[o.ˈno.r(e)‿e ˈvi.vj‿e.ˈtɛr.na]
[kon la ˈvi.ta]
[e ˈɡlɔ.rja di.ˈta.lja]

[o an.ˈti.ka re.ˈpub.bli.ka]
[o.ˈno.re a te]

English translation

𝄆 Oh ancient Republic,
honour to thee righteous
honour to thee. 𝄇

Generous, trusted,
Righteous.
Oh, Republic,

Honour and live forever
with the life
and the glory of Italy.

Oh ancient Republic,
honour to thee.
