= Baruch Berliner =

Israeli composer

- ברוך ברלינר
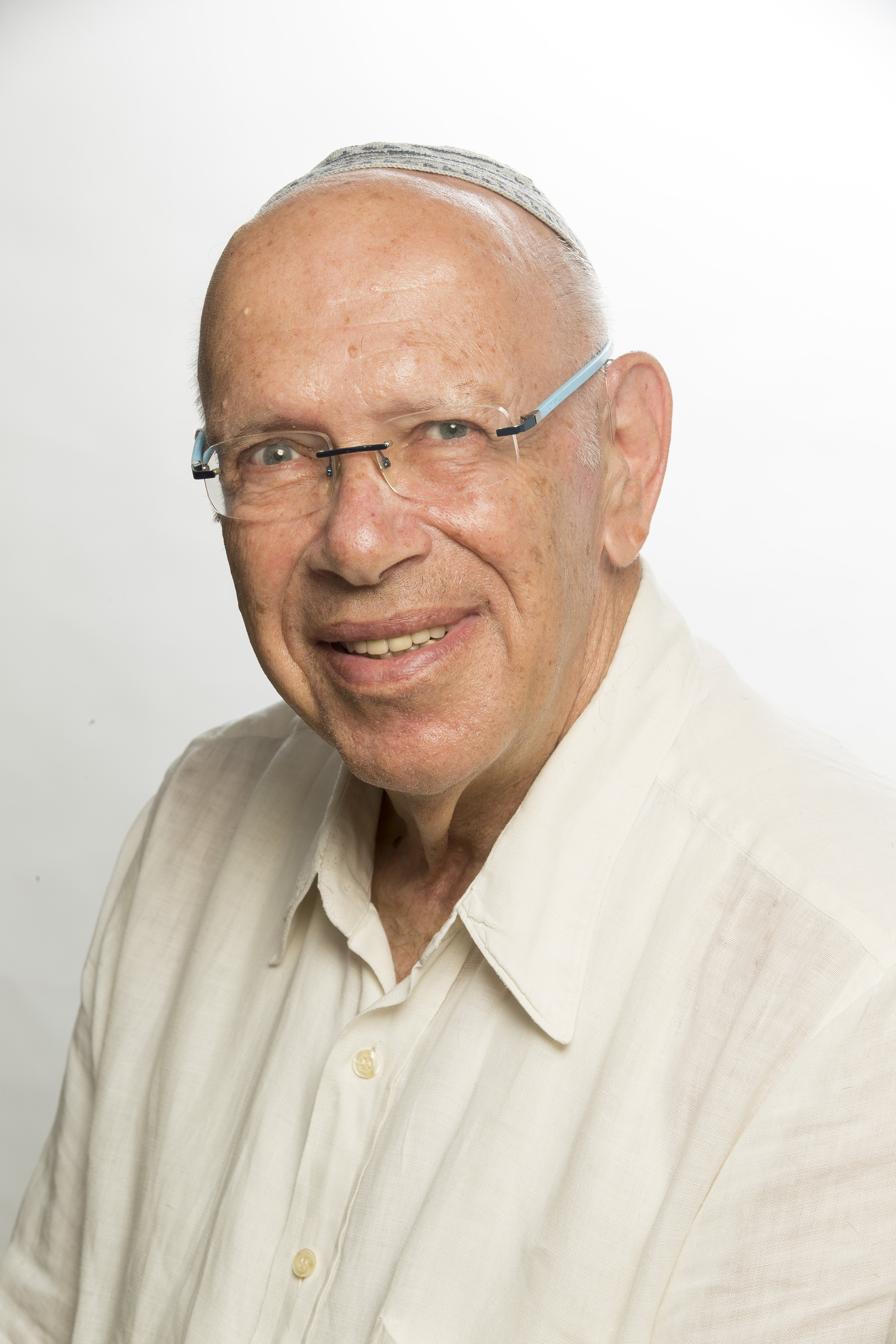
- Baruch Berliner, August 2016
- Born: Tel Aviv

Baruch Berliner (Hebrew: ברוך ברלינר; born in 1942) is an Israeli composer, mathematician and poet. He is the author of musical works, songs, books, and articles.

== Biography ==
Baruch Berliner was born in Tel Aviv. He completed his doctoral studies in mathematics at the University of Zurich in Switzerland, where he also worked as an actuary at the Swiss reinsurance company "Swiss Re", One of The largest Reinsurance in the world, until 1990, when he returned with his family to Israel.

From 1990 until his retirement in 2007, he served as a senior researcher at the Faculty of Management at Tel Aviv University and as the chairman of the Erhard Scientific insurance Institute. As part of his work and research, he was invited to lecture at many universities and actuarial conferences. Wrote two books and over 100 articles on actuarial, finance and economics.

For years he has been writing poetry in Hebrew, German and English. Besides the work "The Creation of the World", other works such as "Abraham" which is a symphonic poem for a philharmonic orchestra, a narrator and a male choir, as well as pleasant South American dances to the waltz rhythm. In 2016 a memorial concert was held in Kyiv that marked the 75th anniversary of the Babi Yar massacre. At the same concert conducted by Alex Ansky, the Ukraine Symphony Orchestra played Berliner's works: "Abraham" and "Cain and Abel", after which his works were performed at the Huberman Festival in Poland, in Bulgaria, United States, Portugal, Russia, France, Serbia, Austria, Estonia, Kazakhstan, Moldova, Armenia, Austria and Romania. Also, the premiere of his work "Yakov's Ladder". 20 concerts that were supposed to take place during 2020, including concerts in Leipzig and Hamburg in Germany, were canceled due to the Coronavirus.

In addition, a book of his humorous poems in German was published in 2020. Umgestülpter humor.

In 2021, concerts of his works dealing with the Torah were presented for the first time in Muslim countries such as Turkey, Kyrgyzstan and Kazakhstan.

In 2024, his work, the symphonic poem, Jacob's Dream, was honored to be performed at Carnegie Hall in New York.

In 2022, a new composition by Berliner was released for the Jewish prayer "El Malei Rachamim", the new composition is part of the soundtrack of the movie "The address on the Wall". released that year. With Alex Ansky summarizing the visit and the concert in Kyiv in 2016, the film also describes how quickly and dramatically Jewish life changed with the entry of the Nazis into Kyiv and the massacre in which about 100,000 of Kyiv's Jews were murdered. When out of the chaos emerge several characters who were invited together to the war and the plot of the film, including the German soldier Hans, who was recruited into the Nazi army against his will, when, in contrast to the Nazi cruelty, we witness his innocent and gentle feelings. The film was shown in about 20 festivals around the world, including in Germany, Italy, Greece, Hungary, Cyprus, the United States and more. . In 2023, Berliner's works were played in the demilitarized zone between North Korea and South Korea.

== For further reading ==
- Baruch Berliner, "Limits of insurability of risks", Prentice Hall College Div, 1982
- Gideon Dukov This is my feeling at these concerts, that I am a messenger who conveys the Torah to the world, Makor Rishon. October 3, 2021
