= Manfred Berliner =

German business teacher

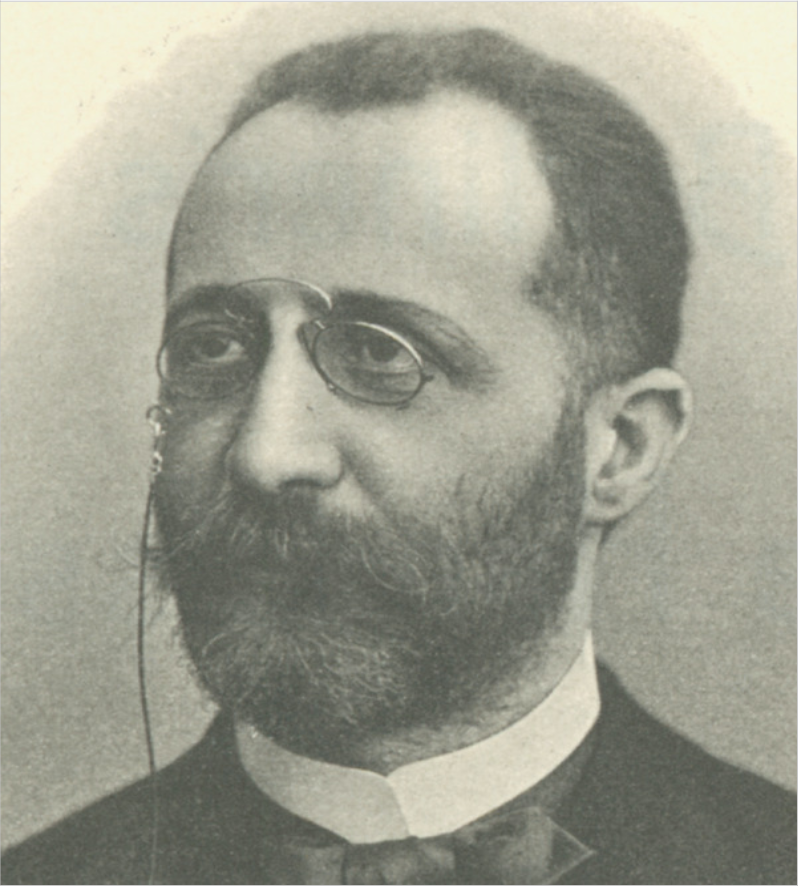
Portrait of Manfred Berliner

Manfred Berliner (1853-1931) was a German teacher who founded Business Teaching Institute in Hanover, which later became Berliner's Advanced Business School.

== Life ==
Berliner was born in 1853, in Hanover. He was the fifth child of textile merchant Samuel Berliner. He had three brothers: Emil (the inventor of the gramophone), Joseph and Jacob.

He took a merchant apprenticeship, served in the Franco-Prussian war, and worked in bookkeeping. He then managed memberships of the Commercial Association. In 1878, he became a business teacher and founded his "Business Teaching Institute" (Handels-Lehr-Institut) in Hanover, which later became "Berliner's Advanced Business School." The school taught mathematics, bookkeeping, trade and exchange, correspondence, and stenography. In 1903, the school was officially accredited as a vocational school.

He was also involved in the management of a Jewish school in Ahlem, founded by Hanover banker Alexander Moritz Simon.

With his wife Hanna (née Dessau), he had five children including Siegfried (b. 1884), Cora (who was murdered in the Holocaust), and Bernhard, an analyst at the Berlin Psychoanalytic Institute who later immigrated to the USA. Siegfried took over direction of Berliner's school in 1913, but was appointed a professor of business administration at the Imperial University of Tokyo.

Berliner died in 1931 and is buried at the Jewish Cemetery "An der Strangriede" in Hanover. In his lifetime he came to own 80 properties in Germany which are still held in trust to benefit his heirs. The properties were subject to extensive litigation following the Nazi regime.

== Publications ==
- with Louis Rothschild and Heinrich Gebauer, "L. Rothschild's Pocketbook Merchants." 1893
- The Trade University: A contribution to its assessment. 1899.
- Commercial Accounting in the draft of the New Commercial Code: a critique and counter proposals 1896.
- Difficult cases and general principles of Commercial Accounting. 1902
- Arithmetic book for trade schools and business trading schools. 1905
- Accounting and Accounting theory, 1911.
- Determining the valuation of businesses enterprises for their sale and exchange, 1913.
- Two Months in Big Business: The reality of business dealings as the basis for teaching accounting and business correspondence, 1915.
- 50 principles for the theory of commercial accounting, 1915
- Practice of Accountancy, 1919
- The valuation of assets for the balance sheet: a practical guide for businesspeople, lawyers, and tax officials, 1920.
