= Gérard Berliner =

French actor and composer

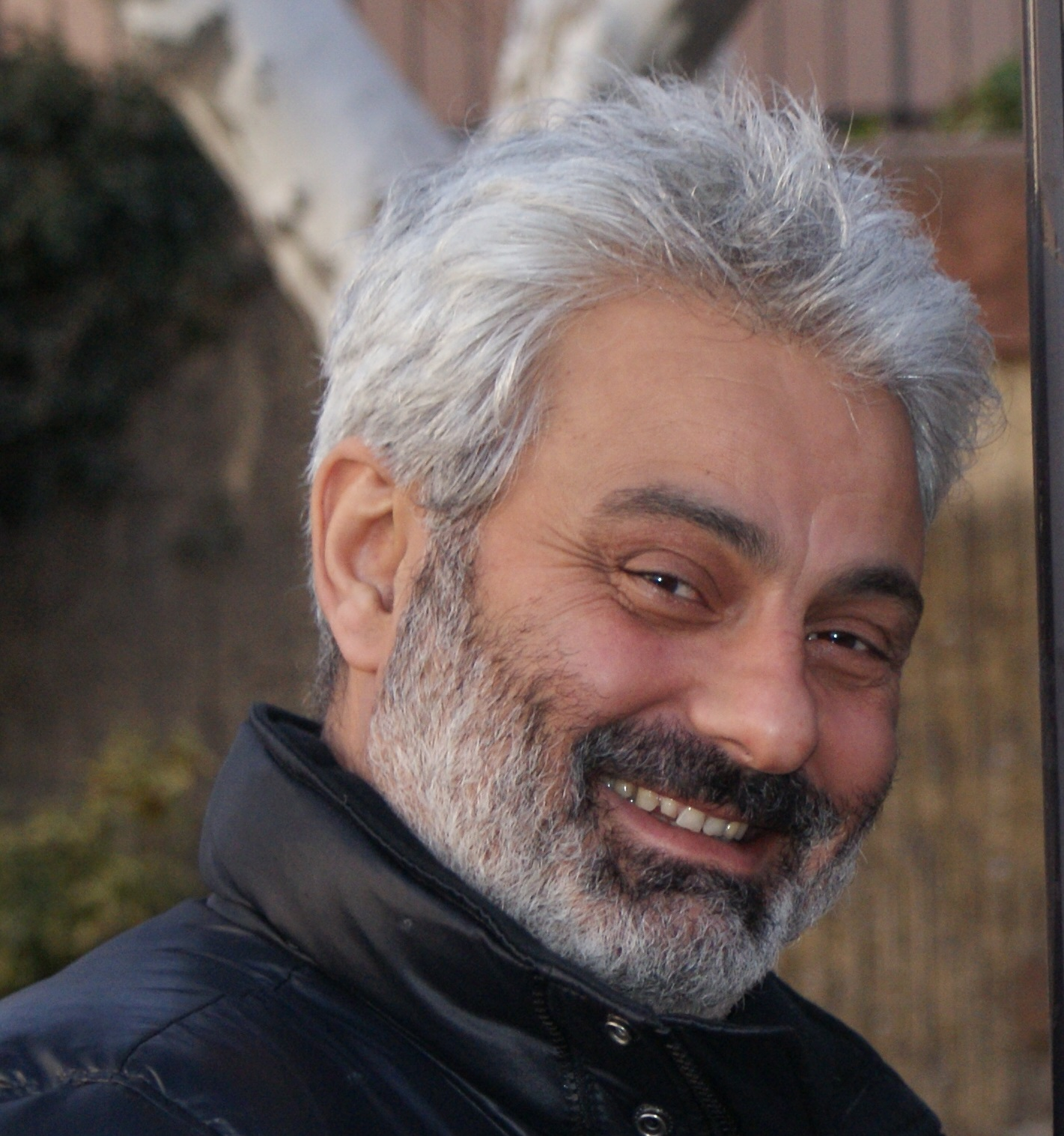
Image of Gérard Berliner

Gérard Berliner (1956–2010) was a French actor and composer.

== Biography ==
He made his debut in show business at age 13, playing small roles in film and theater, before taking drama classes taught by Claude Viriot. At age fifteen, he left his family to live with a record company secretary. Singing was his other passion—he ran a record stall at the flea market—and he had his first hit in 1974 with his song “Pour toi je veux vivre,” released by Philips (single 6009 484). He went on his first tour with the Europe 1 Podium, where he shared the bill with the Martin Circus and Georgette Plana.

At the same time, he worked as an extra on television, notably in variety shows produced by Maritie and Gilbert Carpentier, such as Les Top à..., which gave him the opportunity to meet many songwriters and composers. It was on these sets that he was spotted in 1978 by Serge Lama, who had him open for his concerts. Shortly thereafter, he opened for Marie-Paule Belle at the Olympia.

Four years later, his collaboration with lyricist Frank Thomas propelled him into the spotlight with the song “Louise” (from the album Gerard Berliner), which sold over 400,000 copies in 1982. Gérard Berliner was then a guest on Michel Drucker television show Champs-Élysées, and in October 1983, he performed at the Espace Cardin in Paris, where he opened for Juliette Gréco concerts for a month.

This was followed by two more albums co-written with Frank Thomas: Je porte ma vie (1983) and La Mémoire profane (1984), but these were not successful. Gérard Berliner then went through a difficult period, alternating between appearances in television series and concerts at Parisian venues such as Le Sentier des Halles and the Casino de Paris.

It wasn't until the 1990s that he recorded additional albums, including those he wrote himself, such as De toi à moi (1990) and Le Vertige des fleurs (1992); those produced by Charles Aznavour, such as Chien de voyou (1994); and those co-written with Jean-Loup Dabadie, such as Heureux (1997).

It was during this period that he met the “love of his life”: Victor Hugo. He became passionate about Hugo's work and his humanitarian ideals (the abolition of the death penalty, and the rights of women and children).

It was with the guidance of Alain Decaux—and after Gérard Louvin entrusted him with writing the show Hugo illumine Paris, presented at the Eiffel Tower on July 14, 2002, to celebrate the bicentennial of the poet’s birth—that he came up with the idea of staging a show that was half-musical, half-theatrical, Mon alter Hugo, his personal evocation of Victor Hugo’s life, which he would perform for several seasons. He also toured with a show paying tribute to Serge Reggiani. He made appearances on various television programs, and his shows continued to draw large audiences. He was nominated for a 2006 Molière Award in the Best Musical category for Mon alter Hugo. Regarding this show, Alain Decaux says: “At last, Hugo returns to the hands of a man of the people.”

In 2009, Gérard Berliner set out to reinterpret part of singer Serge Reggiani’s repertoire, culminating in the release of a double live CD on Decca Records.

Just as he was about to embark on a tour across France featuring covers of Reggiani’s songs—and having participated in rehearsals with his musicians—Gérard Berliner died of a heart attack on October 13, 2010, at Necker Hospital in Paris. He is buried at Père Lachaise Cemetery (Section 44).
