= Orzeł (surname) =

Polish surname

Orzeł is a Polish surname.

- Chad Orzel, American science writer
- Conrad Orzel (born 2000), Canadian figure skater
- Kazimierz Orzeł (born 1943), Polish long-distance runner
- Sławomir Orzeł (born 1979), Polish bodybuilder
- Stanley J. Orzel, American film director
