= Nahman Berlin =

Jewish author

Naḥman ben Simḥah Berlin
- נחמן בן שמחה ברלין מליסא

Personal life
- Born: Berlin, Prussia
- Occupation: Polemic Writer

Religious life
- Religion: Judaism
- Denomination: Orthodox Judaism

Naḥman ben Simḥah Berlin (Hebrew: נחמן בן שמחה ברלין מליסא; fl. late 18th–early 19th century) was a Jewish polemical writer from Lissa, Prussia. Although he was originally a supporter of the Haskalah movement, he grew to view it as morally corrupt. His primary literary activity was devoted to the cause of orthodoxy, opposing steadfastly and systematically all attempts at the reform of Judaism.

== Biography ==
Nahman was once a member of the Maskilim, living in Berlin, his hometown, and working in the Jewish Free School as an inspector. He believed that the school could serve as a means of creating a balanced European-Jewish identity for the Jewish youth, but would later acknowledge that it became an avenue for assimilation much to his dismay. At first he attempted to salvage the Haskalah movement, arguing that it was only possible through traditional Jewish Education while conceding that it was morally bereft tutors who were corrupting youths who had not yet learned necessary morals which led to heresies and immorality. He, along with other Jews, who saw Enlightenment thinkers increasingly becoming morally degenerate and licentious left the city in the late 1790s to criticize the movement they once supported. In the midst of this diaspora, Nahman moved to Lissa in the Posen district in 1801, completely rejecting the movement he previously advocated for.

It was easy for Nahman to move to Lissa due to his personal wealth and the fact that his grandfather had been a doctor in the town. He would marry the only daughter, Chaje, of the community rabbi, Seeb Wolf Jacob Guhrauer, in 1801 and would work closely with his new father in law. While in Prussia, he would continue to keep contact with the Jewish community in Berlin and make a name for himself as an advocate for reaffirming Orthodox Judaism while integrating it with a society that allowed for Jewish Emancipation.

Nahman's literary activity was wholly devoted to the cause of orthodoxy, opposing steadfastly and systematically all the attempts of Reform Judaism. He argued that the Reform were in opposition to both religious and political authorities, and that secular governments could be enlisted to help burn the works of reformer's like Eliezer Liebermann.

== Bibliography ==
- ʻEn Mishpat [The Critical Eye of Judgment]. Berlin. 1796. Directed against the editors of the Hebrew periodical Ha-Meassef, and especially against Aaron Wolfssohn.
- Keter Torah [The Crown of the Law]. Dyhernfurth. 1810. An introduction to the Ḥavot Da'at of Jacob ben Moses of Lissa.
- Judah. Berlin. 1818. Against the innovators.
- Kaddur katan [The Small Globe]. Berlin. 1819. Against several works by different reform writers.
- ʻEt le-daber [Time to Speak Out] (PDF). Berlin. 1819. On the traditions of oral law, as well as on the necessity of having the prayers in Hebrew.
- Simḥah [Joy]. Berlin. 1819. A call to unity in religious affairs.
