= Paul Berliner (trader) =

American Investor

Paul S. Berliner is an investor who manages Levite Capital Management, a family office in New York City. Berliner dropped out of college in 1996 to pursue an interest in finance, landing an entry-level position at Value Line, Inc. He then moved on to Market Guide, Inc., which merged with Multex.com in 1999. With a background built in fundamental analysis, in 2000, Berliner then joined The Colonial Fund, a long/short hedge fund, as a research analyst. In 2003, he then moved on to Schottenfeld Associates, followed by other trading outfits, before launching his family office in 2013. Referencing activity that occurred while working as a trader & analyst associated with the proprietary trading desk of brokerage firm Schottenfeld Group, in April 2008, Berliner was simultaneously charged by/settled with the U.S. Securities and Exchange Commission for allegedly spreading a rumor designed to lower the stock price of Alliance Data Systems Berliner allegedly had sold short borrowed stock of Alliance Data Systems, hoping to profit by repurchasing the stock when the price fell. The rumor, circulated over AOL Instant Messenger on November 29, 2007, stated ADS getting pounded -hearing the board is now meeting on a revised proposal from Blackstone to acquire the company at $70/share, down from $81.50. Blackstone is negotiating a lower price due to weakness in World Financial Network -part of ADS' Credit Services Unit, as evidence [sic] by awful master trust data this month from the World Financial Network Holdings off-balance sheet credit vehicle. Berliner settled the charges on April 24, 2008 - without admitting or denying any wrongdoing - by disgorging profits, paying a $130,000 fine, and agreeing to a permanent bar from associating with any broker or dealer. Ironically, just one week earlier, the merger deal collapsed as Alliance Data Systems alleged that the affiliates of the Blackstone Group breached their contractual obligations by refusing to accept reasonable and customary regulatory requirements.
