= Battle of Kolno =

Prussian-Polish Battle during the Kościuszko Uprising 1794

- Part of Kościuszko Uprising
Date	10 July 1794
Location	Kolno, Polish–Lithuanian Commonwealth (now part of Poland) 53°24′38″N 21°56′02″E
Result	Indecisive

Belligerents
Poland–Lithuania	Kingdom of Prussia

Commanders and leaders
Walenty Kwaśniewski	Heinrich Johann Günther

Strength
~1,450	~750

Casualties and losses
~130, including 54 captives executed	~100

The Battle of Kolno was fought on 10 July 1794 during the Kościuszko Uprising, between Polish–Lithuanian insurgents, led by Colonel Walenty Kwaśniewski, and Prussian Army led by General Heinrich Johann Günther. It took place in Kolno, in Polish–Lithuanian Commonwealth, now part of Poland, and ended without definitive victors, with both sides retreating.

== History ==
Prussian General Heinrich Johann Günther, carrying about 750 troops, marched from Kozioł near the Pisa river to Szczuczyn, when on 9 July, he found the presence of Polish–Lithuanian insurgents, led by colonel Walenty Kwaśniewski, stationed in Kolno. Günther decided to strike it by surprise. At 1 am, the Prussians attacked the town, which contained around 1,450 Polish–Lithuanian soldiers.

The Prussians struck at the insurgents positions through the dikes on the Łabna river. The attack collapsed under the Polish–Lithuanian infantry fire. At around 10 am, Günther ordered the battle to be stopped and all captured prisoners of war executed, after which he withdrew near Pisz. Kwaśniewski's group, on the other hand, withdrew to Borkowo.
