= Skroda Wielka =

- Village
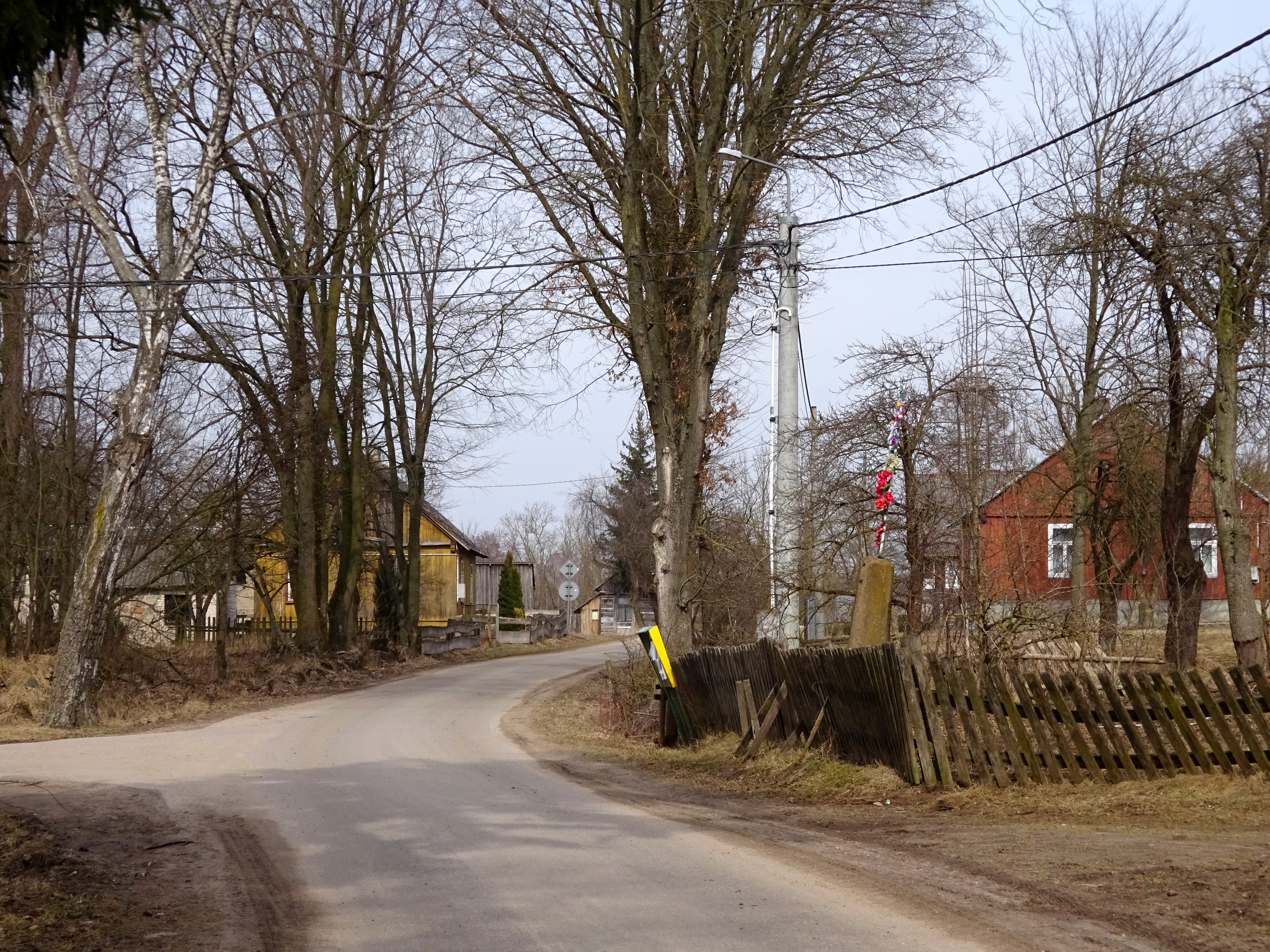

- Location within Poland
- Coordinates: 53°25′N 22°5′E
- Country: Poland
- Voivodeship: Podlaskie
- County: Kolno
- Gmina: Grabowo

Population
  - Total: 159
- Postal code: 18-507
- Vehicle registration: BKL

Skroda Wielka [ˈskrɔda ˈvjɛlka] is a village in the administrative district of Gmina Grabowo, within Kolno County, Podlaskie Voivodeship, in north-eastern Poland.

Four Polish citizens were murdered by Nazi Germany in the village during World War II.
