= Wanacja =

- Village
- Location within Poland
- Coordinates: 53°24′N 21°38′E
- Country: Poland
- Voivodeship: Podlaskie
- County: Kolno
- Gmina: Turośl
- Population: 673

Wanacja [vaˈnat͡sja] is a village in the administrative district of Gmina Turośl, within Kolno County, Podlaskie Voivodeship, in north-eastern Poland.
