= Ksebki =

- Village
- Location within Poland
- Coordinates: 53°26′N 21°37′E
- Country: Poland
- Voivodeship: Podlaskie
- County: Kolno
- Gmina: Turośl
- Population: 538

Ksebki [ˈksɛpki] is a village in the administrative district of Gmina Turośl, within the Kolno County, in the Podlaskie Voivodeship of north-eastern Poland. The village is situated approximately 22 km (14 mi) west of Kolno and 109 km (68 mi) west of the regional capital Białystok.

Other historical spellings are Ksepki and Xepki.
