= Krusza =

- Village
- Location within Poland
- Coordinates: 53°22′N 21°42′E
- Country: Poland
- Voivodeship: Podlaskie
- County: Kolno
- Gmina: Turośl
- Population: 367

Krusza [ˈkruʂa] is a village in the administrative district of Gmina Turośl, within Kolno County, Podlaskie Voivodeship, in north-eastern Poland.
