= Zalesie, Gmina Mały Płock =

Zalesie
- Village
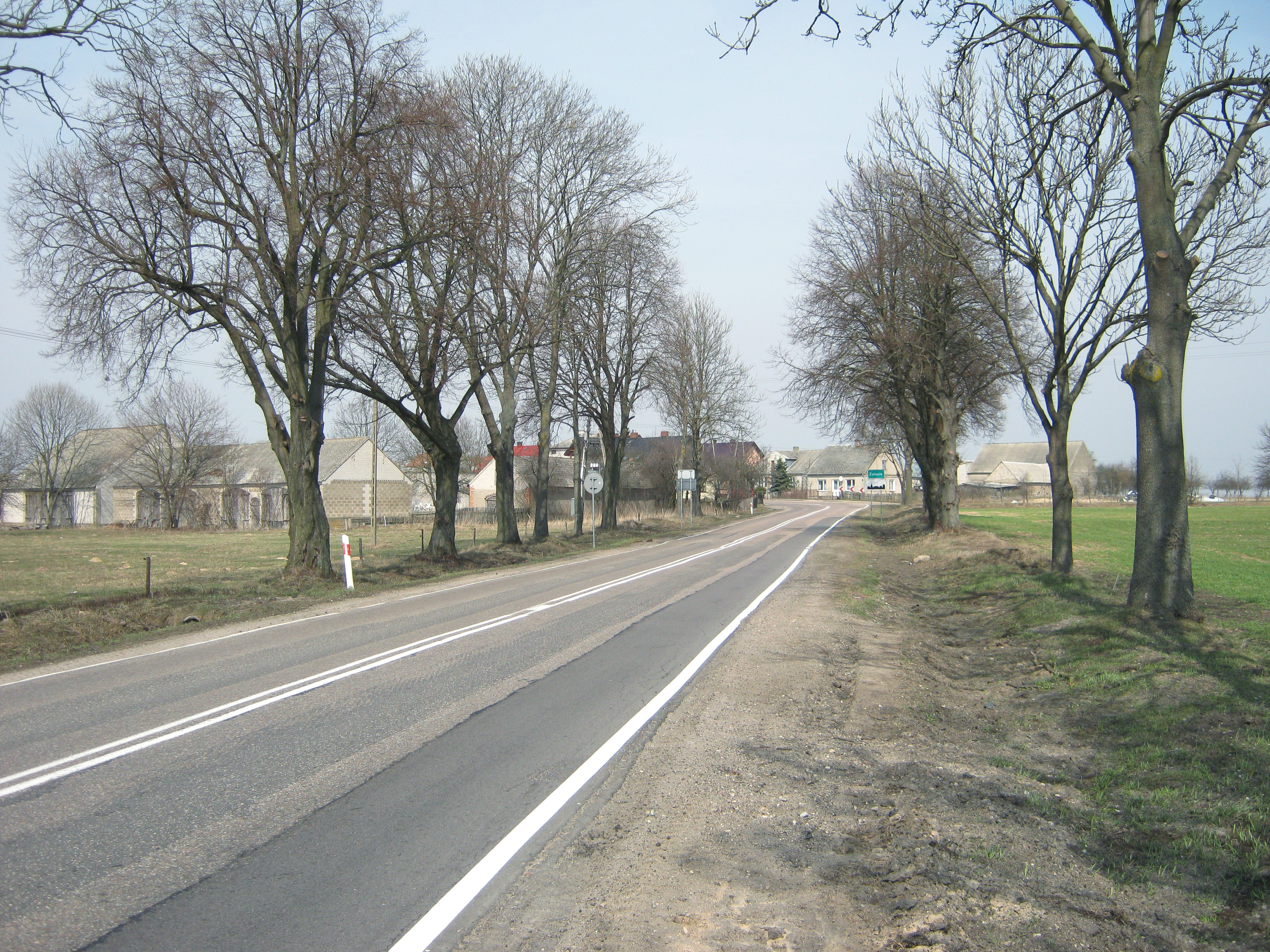

- Location within Poland
- Coordinates: 53°19′48″N 22°0′59″E
- Country: Poland
- Voivodeship: Podlaskie
- County: Kolno
- Gmina: Mały Płock

Population
  - Total: 152
- Postal code: 18-516

Zalesie [zaˈlɛɕɛ] is a village in the administrative district of Gmina Mały Płock, within Kolno County, Podlaskie Voivodeship, in north-eastern Poland.
