= Rogienice Piaseczne =

- Village
- Location within Poland
- Coordinates: 53°17′N 22°5′E
- Country: Poland
- Voivodeship: Podlaskie
- County: Kolno
- Gmina: Mały Płock

Population
  - Total: 90

Rogienice Piaseczne [rɔɡʲɛˈnit͡sɛ pjaˈsɛt͡ʂnɛ] is a village in the administrative district of Gmina Mały Płock, within Kolno County, Podlaskie Voivodeship, in north-eastern Poland.
