= Zabiele, Gmina Kolno =

Zabiele
- Village
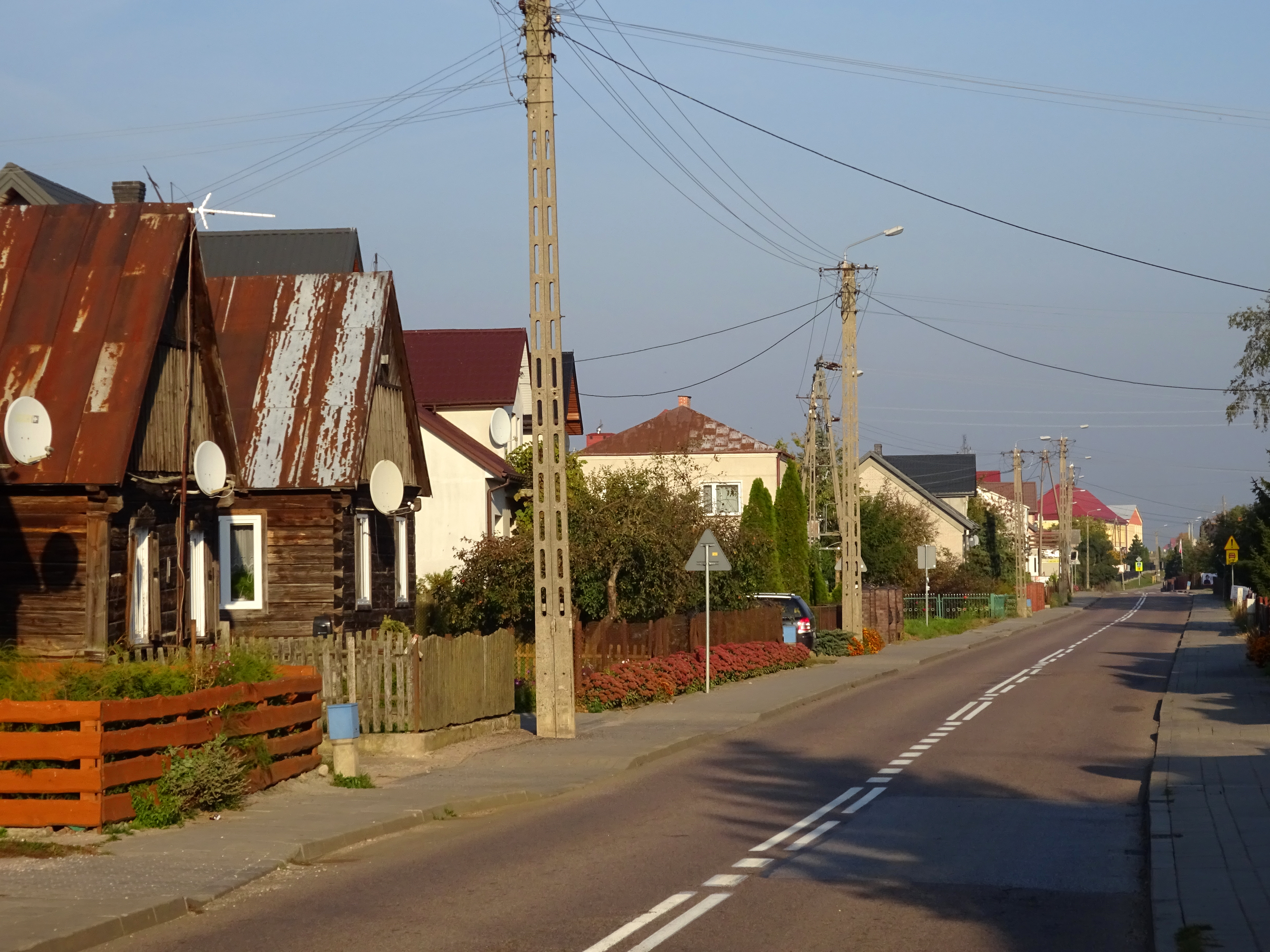
- Coat of arms

- Location within Poland
- Coordinates: 53°23′N 21°51′E
- Country: Poland
- Voivodeship: Podlaskie
- County: Kolno
- Gmina: Gmina Kolno
- Population: 744
- Website: http://www.zabiele.pl/

Zabiele [zaˈbjɛlɛ] is a village in the administrative district of Gmina Kolno, within Kolno County, Podlaskie Voivodeship, in north-eastern Poland.

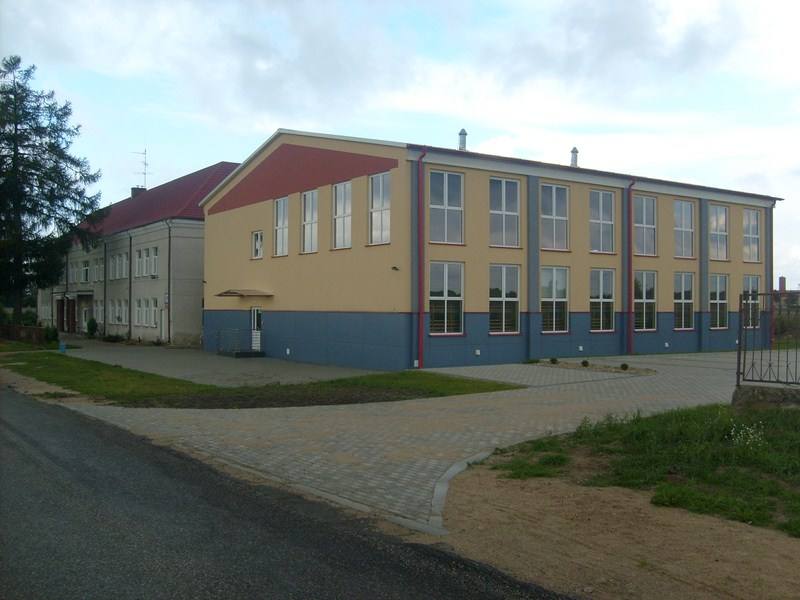
Zabiele School Complex
