= Cieciory =

- Village
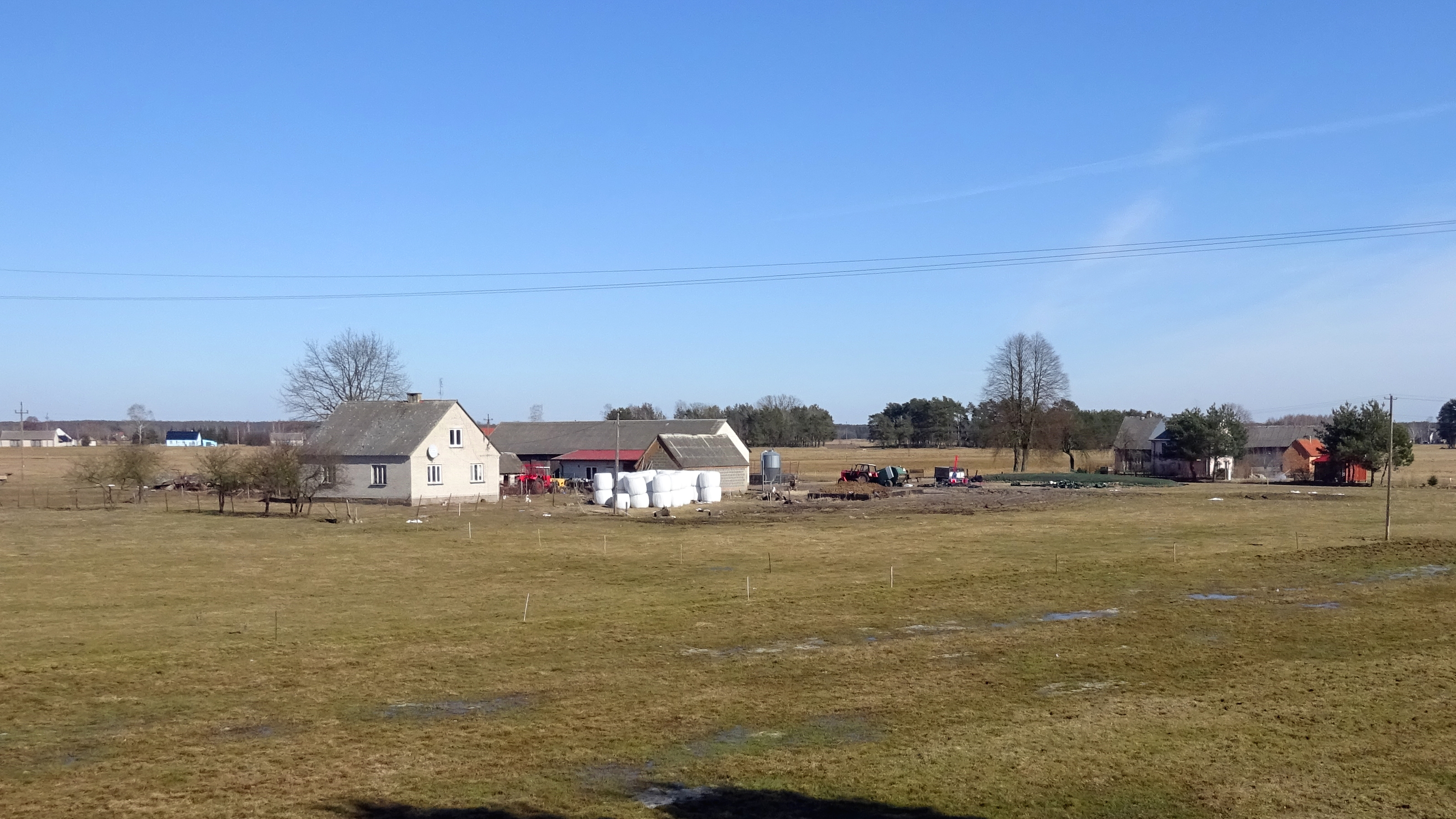

- Location within Poland
- Coordinates: 53°20′N 21°46′E
- Country: Poland
- Voivodeship: Podlaskie
- County: Kolno
- Gmina: Turośl

Population
  - Total: 359
- Time zone: UTC+1 (CET)
  - Summer (DST): UTC+2 (CEST)

Cieciory [t͡ɕɛˈt͡ɕɔrɨ] is a village in the administrative district of Gmina Turośl, within Kolno County, Podlaskie Voivodeship, in north-eastern Poland.

== History ==
Three Polish citizens were murdered by Nazi Germany in the village during World War II.
