= Cwaliny Małe =

- Village
- Location within Poland
- Coordinates: 53°17′N 21°57′E
- Country: Poland
- Voivodeship: Podlaskie
- County: Kolno
- Gmina: Mały Płock
- Population: 66

Cwaliny Małe [t͡sfaˈlinɨ ˈmawɛ] is a village in the administrative district of Gmina Mały Płock, within Kolno County, Podlaskie Voivodeship, in north-eastern Poland.
