= Żebrki =

- Village
- Location within Poland
- Coordinates: 53°29′N 22°12′E
- Country: Poland
- Voivodeship: Podlaskie
- County: Kolno
- Gmina: Grabowo
- Population: 51

Żebrki [ˈʐɛbrki] is a village in the administrative district of Gmina Grabowo, within Kolno County, Podlaskie Voivodeship, in north-eastern Poland.
