= Borzymy =

Borzymy may refer to the following places:

- Borzymy, Masovian Voivodeship (east-central Poland)
- Borzymy, Kolno County in Podlaskie Voivodeship (north-east Poland)
- Borzymy, Siemiatycze County in Podlaskie Voivodeship (north-east Poland)
- Borzymy, Warmian-Masurian Voivodeship (north Poland)
