= Pachuczyn =

- Village
- Location within Poland
- Coordinates: 53°24′N 22°0′E
- Country: Poland
- Voivodeship: Podlaskie
- County: Kolno
- Gmina: Gmina Kolno
- Population: 63

Pachuczyn [paˈxut͡ʂɨn] is a village in the administrative district of Gmina Kolno, within Kolno County, Podlaskie Voivodeship, in north-eastern Poland.

According to the 1921 census, the village was inhabited by 81 people, among whom 81 were Roman Catholic. At the same time, all inhabitants declared Polish nationality. There were 12 residential buildings in the village.
