= Konopki-Białystok =

- Village
- Location within Poland
- Coordinates: 53°26′N 22°7′E
- Country: Poland
- Voivodeship: Podlaskie
- County: Kolno
- Gmina: Grabowo
- Population: 190

Konopki-Białystok (Polish pronunciation: [kɔˈnɔpkʲi bjaˈwɨstɔk]) is a village in the administrative district of Gmina Grabowo, within Kolno County, Podlaskie Voivodeship, in north-eastern Poland.
