= Mściwuje =

- Village
- Location within Poland
- Coordinates: 53°18′N 21°57′E
- Country: Poland
- Voivodeship: Podlaskie
- County: Kolno
- Gmina: Mały Płock
- Population: 126

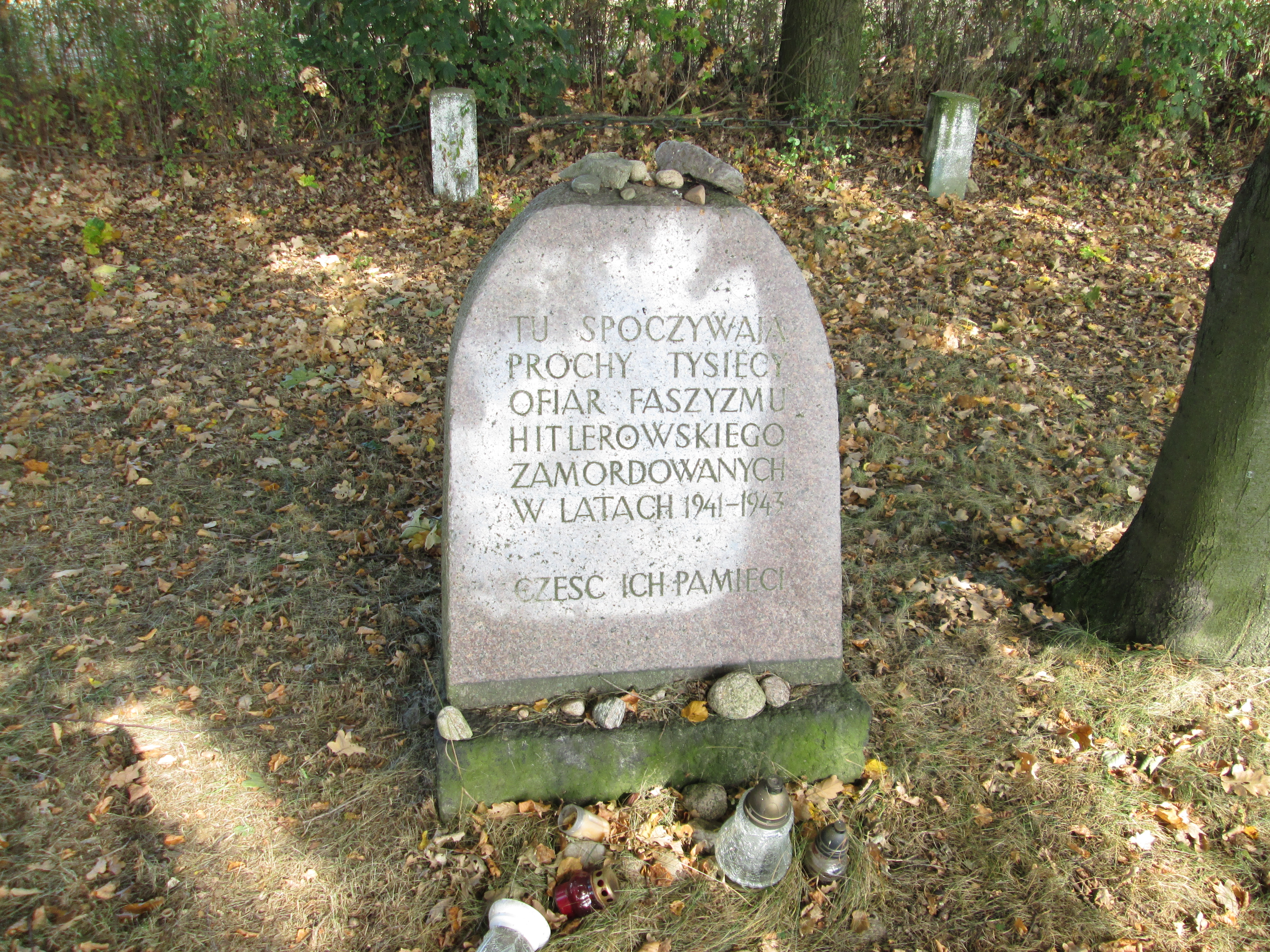
Memorial for the Jews slaughtered in the village during WWII

Mściwuje [mɕt͡ɕiˈvujɛ] is a village in the administrative district of Gmina Mały Płock, within Kolno County, Podlaskie Voivodeship, in north-eastern Poland.

== History ==
According to archives, more than 4000 Jews from the villages of Maly Plock, Stawisk, Kolna and Lomza were shot in Msciwuje.
