= Glinki, Kolno County =

Glinki
- Village
- Location within Poland
- Coordinates: 53°31′N 22°4′E
- Country: Poland
- Voivodeship: Podlaskie
- County: Kolno
- Gmina: Gmina Kolno
- Population: 196

Glinki [ˈɡlinki] is a village in the administrative district of Gmina Kolno, within Kolno County, Podlaskie Voivodeship, in north-eastern Poland.
