= Wszebory =

Wszebory may refer to the following places:

- Wszebory, Sokołów County in Masovian Voivodeship (east-central Poland)
- Wszebory, Wołomin County in Masovian Voivodeship (east-central Poland)
- Wszebory, Podlaskie Voivodeship (north-east Poland)
