= Nowa Ruda, Podlaskie Voivodeship =

Nowa Ruda
- Village
- Location within Poland
- Coordinates: 53°24′N 21°44′E
- Country: Poland
- Voivodeship: Podlaskie
- County: Kolno
- Gmina: Turośl
- Population: 483

Nowa Ruda [ˈnɔva ˈruda] is a village in the administrative district of Gmina Turośl, within Kolno County, Podlaskie Voivodeship, in north-eastern Poland.
