= Wincenta =

- Village
- Location within Poland
- Coordinates: 53°27′22.72″N 21°52′27.91″E
- Country: Poland
- Voivodeship: Podlaskie
- County: Kolno
- Gmina: Gmina Kolno
- Population: 300

Wincenta [vinˈt͡sɛnta] is a village in the administrative district of Gmina Kolno, within Kolno County, Podlaskie Voivodeship, in north-eastern Poland.
