= Kolimagi =

- Village
- Location within Poland
- Coordinates: 53°22′N 21°50′E
- Country: Poland
- Voivodeship: Podlaskie
- County: Kolno
- Gmina: Gmina Kolno
- Population: 96

Kolimagi [kɔliˈmaɡi] is a village in the administrative district of Gmina Kolno, within Kolno County, which is part of Podlaskie Voivodeship in north-eastern Poland.
