= Kossaki, Kolno County =

Kossaki
- Village
- Location within Poland
- Coordinates: 53°27′N 22°4′E
- Country: Poland
- Voivodeship: Podlaskie
- County: Kolno
- Gmina: Gmina Kolno
- Population: 120

Kossaki [kɔsˈsaki] is a village in the administrative district of Gmina Kolno, within Kolno County, Podlaskie Voivodeship, in north-eastern Poland.
