= Edmund Borawski =

Polish politician

member of Sejm 2005-2007
- In office 25 September 2005 – ?

Personal details
- Born: 17 April 1946 (age 79)
- Party: Polish People's Party

Edmund Borawski (born 17 April 1946 in Świdry Podleśne) is a Polish politician. He was elected to Sejm on 25 September 2005, getting 5311 votes in 24 Białystok district as a candidate from the Polish People's Party list.

He was also a member of Sejm 2001-2005.

== See also ==
- Members of Polish Sejm 2005-2007
