= Rogienice Wielkie =

- Village
- Location within Poland
- Coordinates: 53°16′N 22°4′E
- Country: Poland
- Voivodeship: Podlaskie
- County: Kolno
- Gmina: Mały Płock

Population
  - Total: 447
- Time zone: UTC+1 (CET)
  - Summer (DST): UTC+2 (CEST)

Rogienice Wielkie [rɔɡʲɛˈnit͡sɛ ˈvjɛlkʲɛ] is a village in the administrative district of Gmina Mały Płock, within Kolno County, Podlaskie Voivodeship, in north-eastern Poland.

== History ==
Three Polish citizens were murdered by Nazi Germany in the village during World War II.
