= Leman, Poland =

Village in Podlaskie Voivodeship, northeastern Poland

Leman
- Village
- Location within Poland
- Coordinates: 53°28′N 21°40′E
- Country: Poland
- Voivodeship: Podlaskie
- County: Kolno
- Gmina: Turośl
- Population (2009): 411
- Website: http://www.leman-kurpie.pl

Leman [ˈlɛman] is a village in the administrative district of Gmina Turośl, within Kolno County, Podlaskie Voivodeship, in north-eastern Poland.
