= Maria Golimowska =

Polish volleyball player

Personal information
- Full name: Maria Golimowska-Chylińska
- Nationality: Polish
- Born: 28 August 1932 (age 94); Lachowo, Poland

National team
1955–1966	Poland (182)
Honours
Women's volleyball
Representing Poland
Olympic Games
Bronze medal – third place	1964 Tokyo
World Championship
Bronze medal – third place	1956 France
Bronze medal – third place	1962 Soviet Union
European Championship
Silver medal – second place	1963 Romania
Bronze medal – third place	1958 Czechoslovakia
- Last updated: 26 June 2015

Maria Golimowska-Chylińska (born 28 August 1932) is a former Polish volleyball player, a member of Poland women's national volleyball team in 1955–1966, a bronze medalist of the Olympic Games Tokyo 1964, a bronze medalist of the World Championship (1956, 1962) and medalist of the European Championship (silver in 1963, bronze in 1958), Polish Champion (1961).

== Personal life ==
She was born in Lachowo, but now she has been living in Warsaw. His husband Marian is former basketball player. She has daughter Małgorzata and son Marian Jr.
