= Gałązki, Podlaskie Voivodeship =

Village in Gmina Grabowo, Poland

Gałązki
- Village
- Location within Poland
- Coordinates: 53°28′17″N 22°14′56″E
- Country: Poland
- Voivodeship: Podlaskie
- County: Kolno
- Gmina: Grabowo

Gałązki [ɡaˈwɔ̃ski] is a village in the administrative district of Gmina Grabowo, within Kolno County, Podlaskie Voivodeship, in north-eastern Poland.
