= Przyborowo, Podlaskie Voivodeship =

Przyborowo
- Village
- Location within Poland
- Coordinates: 53°30′N 22°7′E
- Country: Poland
- Voivodeship: Podlaskie
- County: Kolno
- Gmina: Grabowo
- Population: 130

Przyborowo [pʂɨbɔˈrɔvɔ] is a village in the administrative district of Gmina Grabowo, within Kolno County, Podlaskie Voivodeship, in north-eastern Poland.
