= Cieloszka =

- Village
- Location within Poland
- Coordinates: 53°23′N 21°41′E
- Country: Poland
- Voivodeship: Podlaskie
- County: Kolno
- Gmina: Turośl
- Population: 418

Cieloszka [t͡ɕɛˈlɔʂka] is a village in the administrative district of Gmina Turośl, within Kolno County, Podlaskie Voivodeship, in north-eastern Poland.

In 2008 the village had a population of 418.
