= Pupki, Podlaskie Voivodeship =

Pupki
- Village
- Location within Poland
- Coordinates: 53°21′N 21°48′E
- Country: Poland
- Voivodeship: Podlaskie
- County: Kolno
- Gmina: Turośl
- Population: 111

Pupki ([ˈpupki]; translation: Small Bottoms) is a village in the administrative district of Gmina Turośl, within Kolno County, Podlaskie Voivodeship, in north-eastern Poland.
