= Nowe Rakowo =

- Village
- Location within Poland
- Coordinates: 53°20′N 21°58′E
- Country: Poland
- Voivodeship: Podlaskie
- County: Kolno
- Gmina: Mały Płock
- Population: 154

Nowe Rakowo [ˈnɔvɛ raˈkɔvɔ] is a village in the administrative district of Gmina Mały Płock, within Kolno County, Podlaskie Voivodeship, in north-eastern Poland.
