= Kołaki-Wietrzychowo =

- Village
- Location within Poland
- Coordinates: 53°18′N 22°4′E
- Country: Poland
- Voivodeship: Podlaskie
- County: Kolno
- Gmina: Mały Płock
- Population: 93

Kołaki-Wietrzychowo [kɔˈwaki vjɛtʂɨˈxɔvɔ] is a village in the administrative district of Gmina Mały Płock, within Kolno County, Podlaskie Voivodeship, in north-eastern Poland.
