= Lacha =

Lacha in geography may refer to:

- Łacha, Podlaskie Voivodeship
- Łacha, Masovian Voivodeship
- Lake Lacha in Russia

It may also refer to:

- Lacha, a Basque sheep breed.
