= Kamińskie =

- Village
- Location within Poland
- Coordinates: 53°29′N 22°14′E
- Country: Poland
- Voivodeship: Podlaskie
- County: Kolno
- Gmina: Grabowo
- Population: 60

Kamińskie [kaˈmiɲskʲɛ] is a village in the administrative district of Gmina Grabowo, within Kolno County, Podlaskie Voivodeship, in north-eastern Poland.
