= Helena Krzemieniewska =

Polish microbiologist and botanist (1878–1966)

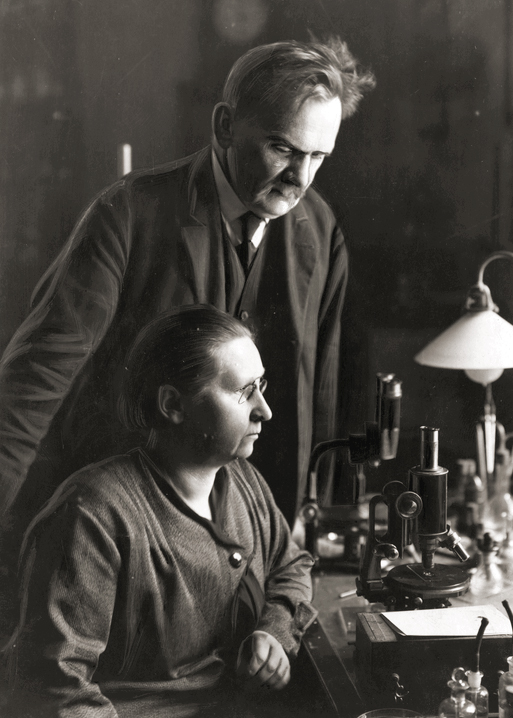
- Helena Krzemieniewska with her husband Seweryn Krzemieniewski
- Born: Helena Józefa Choynowskich; 13 March 1878; Lachowo, Poland
- Died: 28 May 1966 (aged 88); Wrocław, Poland
- Education: Jagiellonian University, Doctor of Philosophy
- Scientific career
- Fields: Botany; Microbiology
- Workplaces: University of Wrocław; Wrocław University of Environmental and Life Sciences

Helena Krzemieniewska (1878–1966) was a Polish botanist and microbiologist, noted for studying myxobacteria and myxophyta in soil. The standard author abbreviation Krzemien. is used to indicate this person as the author when citing a botanical name.

== Biography ==
Krzemieniewska was born 13 March 1878 in Lachowo, Poland, as the daughter of the wealthy landowner Ludwik Choynowski and Zofia Ciemieniewska. She graduated from the Women's School in Warsaw in 1894 and went to Krakow, Poland, where she graduated from the Faculty of Life Sciences in 1896 with a degree in Higher Scientific Courses for Women. She then became one of the first women to study at the Jagiellonian University in Krakow. She studied mathematics there from 1896 and botany from 1898 to 1900 under the botanist Władysław Szafer and the embryologist Emil Godlewski. After marrying the botanist and plant microbiologist Seweryn Krzemieniewski in 1899, she worked with him scientifically and expanded her knowledge at the universities in Delft, Holland and Leipzig, Germany.

During the First World War, Krzemieniewska worked as a nurse in a military hospital and subsequently took part in the vaccination campaigns against typhus and smallpox. From 1920 to 1924, she was deputy professor of botany at the Faculty of Forestry at Lwów Polytechnic, during which time she and her husband conducted research into the morphology and physiology of myxobacteria and slime molds. They discovered and described many new species. She and her husband were pioneers and founders of soil microbiology in Poland.

From 1941 to 1944, she worked at Rudolf Weigl's Institute for typhus and virus research at the university in Lviv (now the Ivan Franko National University in Lviv, Ukraine), which was then under German occupation. In 1944, she moved to Warsaw, where she took part in the Warsaw Uprising. She then moved with her husband to Krakow, Poland, where he died in April 1945.

After the War ended, Krzemieniewska completed her doctorate under Władysław Szafer at the Jagiellonian University in 1945 and worked as a senior assistant at the Botanical Garden of the Jagiellonian University from June 1945.[3] In 1946, she was appointed full professor and head of the Department of Plant Physiology at the University of Wrocław, and she headed this department until her retirement in 1955. She taught microbiology at the University of Wrocław and botany at the University of Agriculture in Wrocław. She then worked as a professor at the Department of Botany at the Polish Academy of Sciences in Wrocław until 1960.

She was an active member of numerous scientific societies, including the Polish Botanical Society and the Polish Microbiological Society. She died at 88 on 28 May 1966.

== Selected works ==
Krzemieniewska was the author of around 50 scientific papers on soil bacteriology and the biology and systematics of mycobacteria, specific bacteria and soil fungi.

- Krzemieniewska, Helena (1926). Miksobakterje Polski (in Polish). Polskie Towarzystwo Botaniczne.
- Krzemieniewska, Helena (1930). Le cycle évolutif de Spirochaeta cytophaga Hutchinson et Clayton (in French).
- Krzemieniewska, Helena (1933). Spirochaeta cytophaga Hutch i Clayt oraz Cytophaga Hutchinsoni Winogradsky: (studjum porównawcze) (in Polish). Czcionkami Drukarni Uniwersytetu Poznańskiego.
- Krzemieniewska, Helena (1947). Śluzowce: klucz do oznaczania najpospolitszych rodzajów i opisy niektórych ich gatunków (in Polish). Państwowe Zakłady Wydawnictw Szkolnych.
- Krzemieniewska, Helena (1960). Śluzowce Polski na tle flory śluzowców europejskich (in Polish). Państwowe Wydawn. Naukowe.

Krzemieniewska edited the exsiccata Myxomycetes Poloniae Exsiccatae (1938).
