= Kąty, Kolno County =

Kąty
- Village
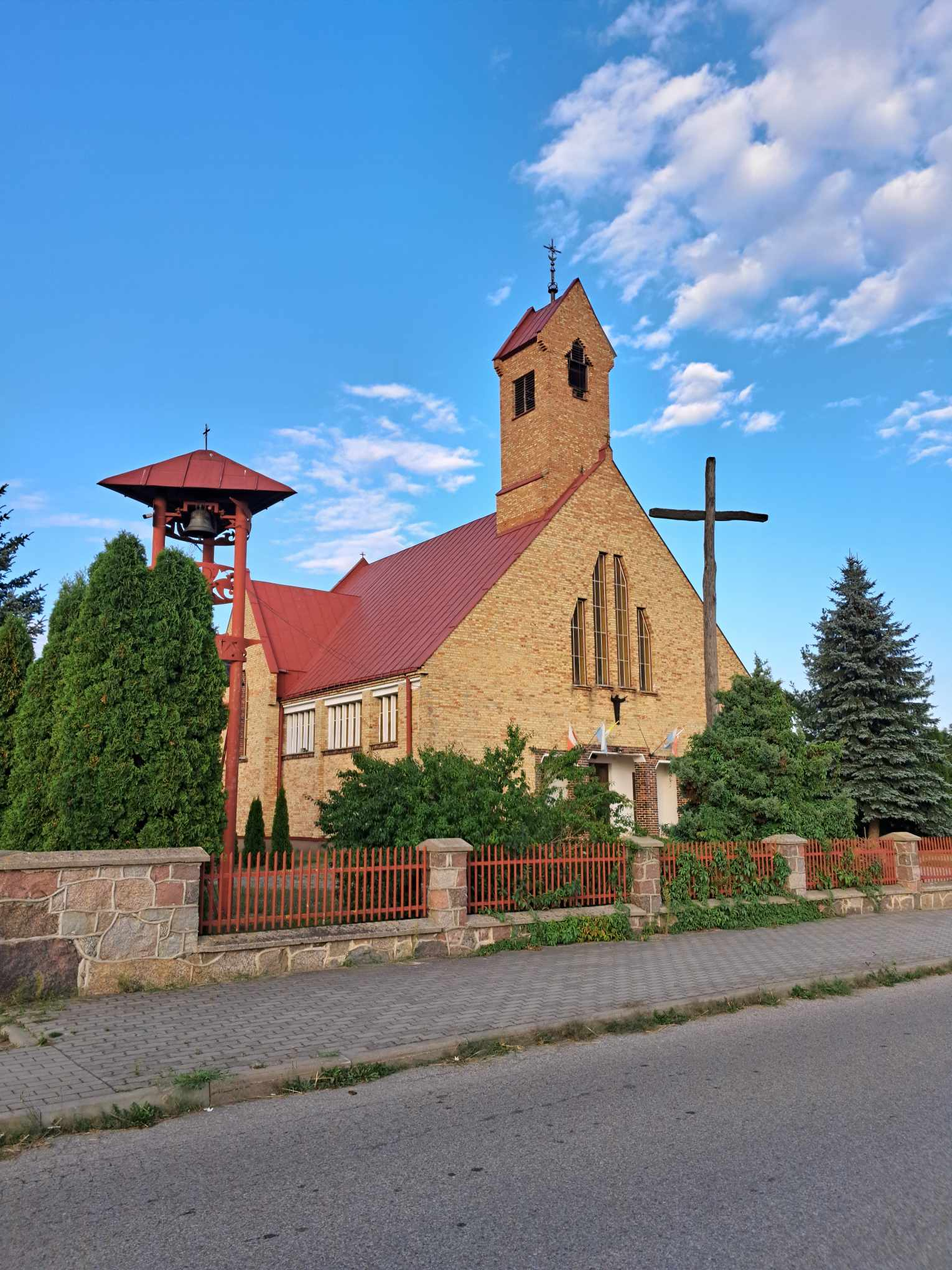
- Church of the Blessed Virgin Mary of the Gate of Dawn

- Location within Poland
- Coordinates: 53°18′N 21°56′E
- Country: Poland
- Voivodeship: Podlaskie
- County: Kolno
- Gmina: Mały Płock
- Population: 556

Kąty [ˈkɔntɨ] is a village in the administrative district of Gmina Mały Płock, within Kolno County, Podlaskie Voivodeship, in north-eastern Poland.
