= Niksowizna =

- Village
- Location within Poland
- Coordinates: 53°19′N 21°52′E
- Country: Poland
- Voivodeship: Podlaskie
- County: Kolno
- Gmina: Gmina Kolno
- Population: 97

Niksowizna [niksɔˈvizna] is a village in the administrative district of Gmina Kolno, within Kolno County, Podlaskie Voivodeship, in north-eastern Poland.

According to the 1921 census, the village was inhabited by 217 people, among whom 204 were Roman Catholic, 7 Evangelical, and 6 Mosaic. At the same time, 211 inhabitants declared Polish nationality, and 6 were Jewish. There were 47 residential buildings in the village.
