= Zimna, Podlaskie Voivodeship =

Zimna
- Village
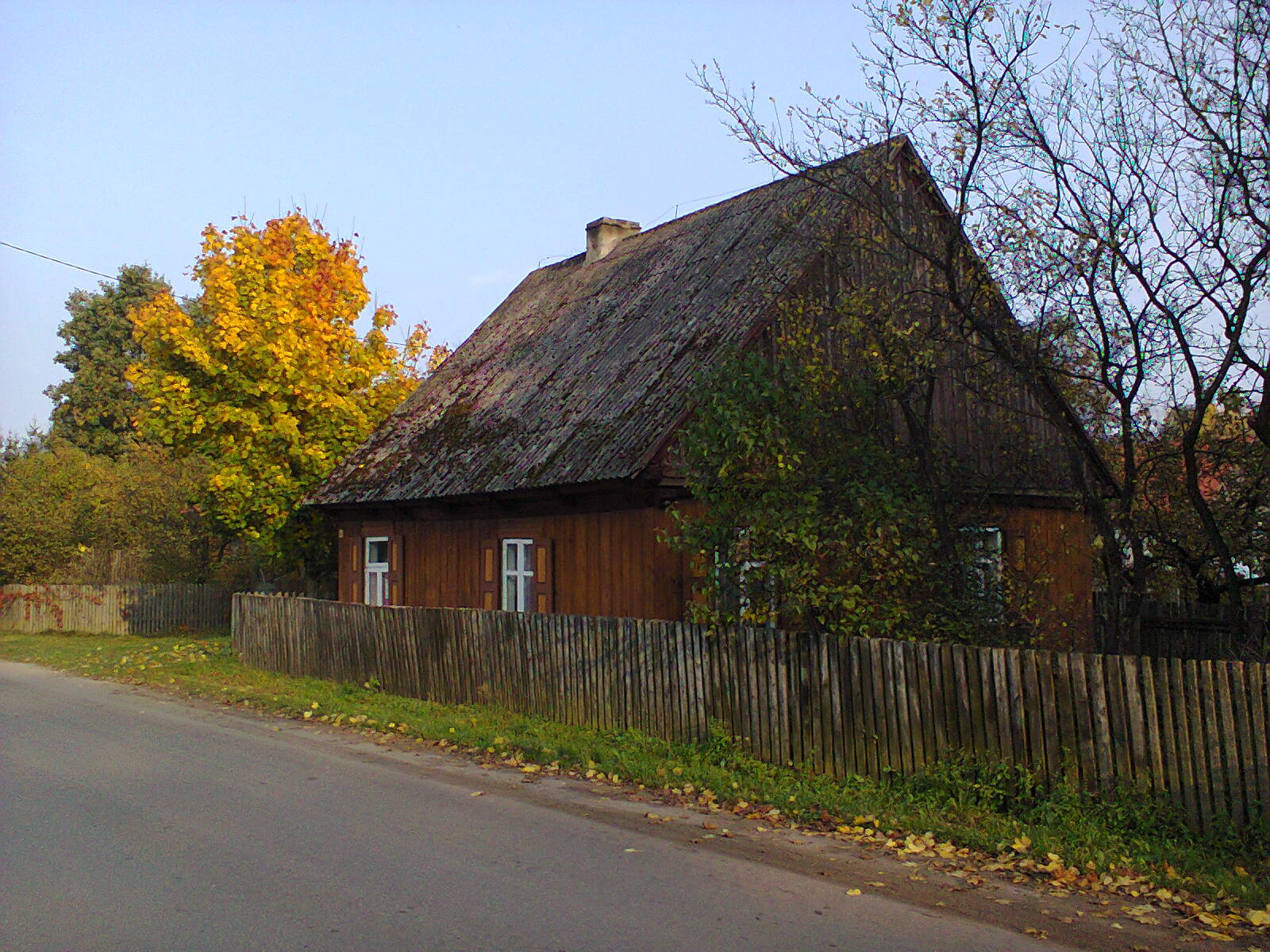

- Location within Poland
- Coordinates: 53°28′N 21°40′E
- Country: Poland
- Voivodeship: Podlaskie
- County: Kolno
- Gmina: Turośl
- Population: 180

Zimna [ˈʑimna] is a village in the administrative district of Gmina Turośl, within Kolno County, Podlaskie Voivodeship, in north-eastern Poland.
