= Grądy-Michały =

- Village
- Location within Poland
- Coordinates: 53°30′N 22°15′E
- Country: Poland
- Voivodeship: Podlaskie
- County: Kolno
- Gmina: Grabowo
- Population: 40

Grądy-Michały [ˈɡrɔndɨ miˈxawɨ] is a village in the administrative district of Gmina Grabowo, within Kolno County, Podlaskie Voivodeship, in north-eastern Poland.
