= Milewo-Gałązki =

- Village
- Location within Poland
- Coordinates: 53°31′N 22°7′E
- Country: Poland
- Voivodeship: Podlaskie
- County: Kolno
- Gmina: Grabowo
- Population: 100

Milewo-Gałązki [miˈlɛvɔ ɡaˈwɔ̃ski] is a village in the administrative district of Gmina Grabowo, within Kolno County, Podlaskie Voivodeship, in north-eastern Poland.
