= Kurkowo =

Kurkowo may refer to:

- Kurkowo, Podlaskie Voivodeship, a village in the administrative district of Gmina Grabowo, Poland
- Kurkowo, Pomeranian Voivodeship, a village in the administrative district of Gmina Czersk, Poland
