= Pudełko =

Settlement in Gmina Turośl, Poland

- Settlement
- Location within Poland
- Coordinates: 53°23′31″N 21°47′39″E
- Country: Poland
- Voivodeship: Podlaskie
- County: Kolno
- Gmina: Turośl

Pudełko [puˈdɛu̯kɔ] is a settlement in the administrative district of Gmina Turośl, within Kolno County, Podlaskie Voivodeship, in north-eastern Poland.
