= Truszki-Zalesie =

- Village
- Location within Poland
- Coordinates: 53°30′N 22°3′E
- Country: Poland
- Voivodeship: Podlaskie
- County: Kolno
- Gmina: Gmina Kolno
- Population: 70

Truszki-Zalesie [ˈtruʂki zaˈlɛɕɛ] is a village in the administrative district of Gmina Kolno, within Kolno County, Podlaskie Voivodeship, in north-eastern Poland.

== See also ==
- Truszki, other villages
