= Wiszowate =

- Village
- Location within Poland
- Coordinates: 53°27′N 22°5′E
- Country: Poland
- Voivodeship: Podlaskie
- County: Kolno
- Gmina: Grabowo
- Population: 155

Wiszowate [viʂɔˈvatɛ] is a village in the administrative district of Gmina Grabowo, within Kolno County, Podlaskie Voivodeship, in north-eastern Poland.

== History ==
Village founded before 1424. Family nest of noble (szlachta) family of Wiszowaty (branch using the "Abdank" coat-of-arms). The family still lives there. In 15th century members of the family founded another two villages of the same name: Wyszowate in Podlaskie Voivodeship and Wyszowate in Warmian-Masurian Voivodeship.
