= Dąbrowa, Gmina Grabowo =

Dąbrowa
- Village
- Location within Poland
- Coordinates: 53°28′57″N 22°14′26″E
- Country: Poland
- Voivodeship: Podlaskie
- County: Kolno
- Gmina: Grabowo

Dąbrowa [dɔmˈbrɔva] is a village in the administrative district of Gmina Grabowo, within Kolno County, Podlaskie Voivodeship, in north-eastern Poland.
