= Marki, Podlaskie Voivodeship =

Marki
- Village
- Location within Poland
- Coordinates: 53°30′N 22°10′E
- Country: Poland
- Voivodeship: Podlaskie
- County: Kolno
- Gmina: Grabowo
- Population: 40

Marki [ˈmarki] is a village in the administrative district of Gmina Grabowo, Kolno County, Podlaskie Voivodeship, in northeastern Poland.
