= Włodki, Podlaskie Voivodeship =

Włodki
- Village
- Location within Poland
- Coordinates: 53°15′N 22°0′E
- Country: Poland
- Voivodeship: Podlaskie
- County: Kolno
- Gmina: Mały Płock
- Population: 184

Włodki [ˈvwɔtki] is a village in the administrative district of Gmina Mały Płock, within Kolno County, Podlaskie Voivodeship, in north-eastern Poland.
