= Rogienice-Wypychy =

- Village
- Location within Poland
- Coordinates: 53°17′N 22°5′E
- Country: Poland
- Voivodeship: Podlaskie
- County: Kolno
- Gmina: Mały Płock
- Population: 41

Rogienice-Wypychy [rɔɡʲɛˈnit͡sɛ vɨˈpɨxɨ] is a village in the administrative district of Gmina Mały Płock, within Kolno County, Podlaskie Voivodeship, in north-eastern Poland.
