= Gmina Kolno, Podlaskie Voivodeship =

Gmina Kolno Kolno Commune
- Gmina
- Flag Coat of arms

- Gmina Kolno within the Kolno County
- Coordinates (Kolno): 53°24′38″N 21°56′2″E
- Country: Poland
- Voivodeship: Podlaskie
- County: Kolno
- Seat: Kolno

Area
  - Total: 282.13 km^{2} (108.93 sq mi)

Population (2011)
  - Total: 8,884
  - Density: 31.49/km^{2} (81.56/sq mi)

Gmina Kolno is a rural gmina (administrative district) in Kolno County, Podlaskie Voivodeship, in north-eastern Poland. Its seat is the town of Kolno, although the town is not part of the territory of the gmina.

The gmina covers an area of 282.13 square kilometres (108.9 sq mi), and as of 2006 its total population is 8,787 (8,884 in 2011).

== Villages ==
Gmina Kolno contains the villages and settlements of Bialiki, Borkowo, Brzózki, Brzozowo, Czernice, Czerwone, Danowo, Filipki Duże, Filipki Małe, Gietki, Glinki, Górskie, Górszczyzna, Gromadzyn-Wykno, Janowo, Kiełcze-Kopki, Kolimagi, Kossaki, Kowalewo, Koziki-Olszyny, Kozioł, Kumelsk, Lachowo, Łosewo, Niksowizna, Obiedzino, Okurowo, Pachuczyn, Rupin, Rydzewo-Świątki, Stare Kiełcze, Stary Gromadzyn, Truszki-Kucze, Truszki-Patory, Truszki-Zalesie, Tyszki-Łabno, Tyszki-Wądołowo, Waszki, Wincenta, Wścieklice, Wszebory, Wykowo, Zabiele, Zakaleń, Zaskrodzie and Żebry.

== Neighbouring gminas ==
Gmina Kolno is bordered by the gminas of Biała Piska, Grabowo, Mały Płock, Pisz, Stawiski, Turośl and Zbójna.
