= Borzymy, Kolno County =

Borzymy
- Village
- Location within Poland
- Coordinates: 53°27′33″N 22°11′2″E
- Country: Poland
- Voivodeship: Podlaskie
- County: Kolno
- Gmina: Grabowo

Borzymy [bɔˈʐɨmɨ] is a village in the administrative district of Gmina Grabowo, within Kolno County, Podlaskie Voivodeship, in north-eastern Poland.
