= Grabowo, Kolno County =

Grabowo
- Village
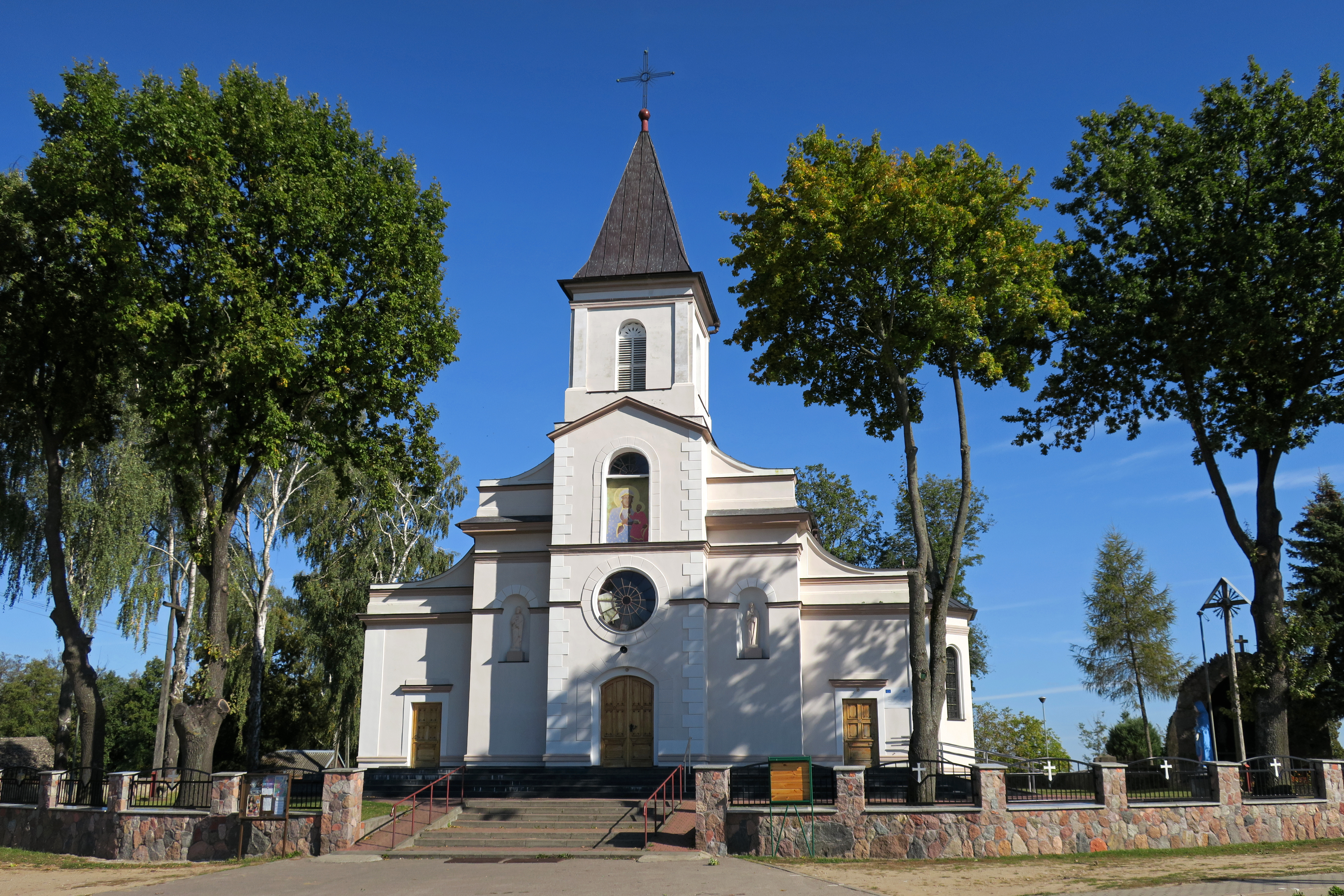
- Saint John the Baptist church in Grabowo

- Location within Poland
- Coordinates: 53°27′N 22°9′E
- Country: Poland
- Voivodeship: Podlaskie
- County: Kolno
- Gmina: Grabowo

Population
  - Total: 800
- Time zone: UTC+1 (CET)
  - Summer (DST): UTC+2 (CEST)
- Vehicle registration: BKL
- Website: Grabowo GOK

Grabowo [ɡraˈbɔvɔ] is a village in Kolno County, Podlaskie Voivodeship, in north-eastern Poland. It is the seat of the gmina (administrative district) called Gmina Grabowo.

== Notable people ==
- Antoni Waga (1799–1890), zoologist, traveller, writer, literary critic
- Jakub Ignacy Waga (1800–1872), botanist and educator
- Bożena Dykiel (1948–2026), actress
