= Łacha, Podlaskie Voivodeship =

Łacha
- Village
- Location within Poland
- Coordinates: 53°27′48″N 21°45′00″E
- Country: Poland
- Voivodeship: Podlaskie
- County: Kolno
- Gmina: Turośl
- Population: 541

Łacha [ˈwaxa] is a village in the administrative district of Gmina Turośl, within Kolno County, Podlaskie Voivodeship, in north-eastern Poland.

== Monuments ==
- Folk sculpture of John of Nepomuk in wayside shrine
