= Turośl, Podlaskie Voivodeship =

Turośl
- Village
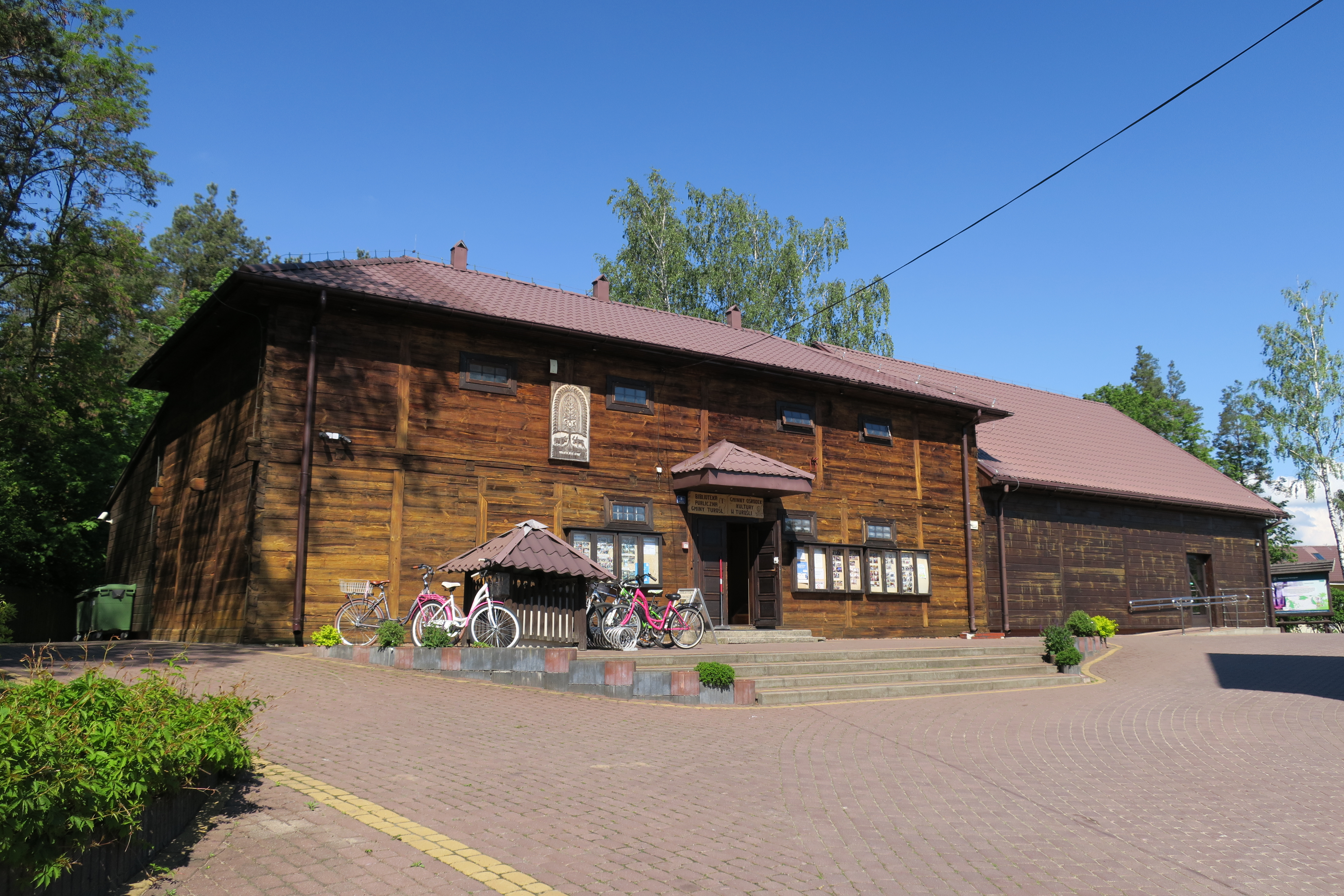

- Location within Poland
- Coordinates: 53°23′N 21°43′E
- Country: Poland
- Voivodeship: Podlaskie
- County: Kolno
- Gmina: Turośl
- Population: 1,500

Turośl [ˈturɔɕl] is a village in Kolno County, Podlaskie Voivodeship, in north-eastern Poland. It is the seat of the gmina (administrative district) called Gmina Turośl.
