= Borkowo, Podlaskie Voivodeship =

Village in Poland

Borkowo
- Village
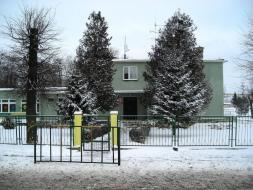
- The village's school building

- Location within Poland
- Coordinates: 53°22′14″N 21°58′9″E
- Country: Poland
- Voivodeship: Podlaskie
- County: Kolno
- Gmina: Gmina Kolno
- Highest elevation: 200 m (660 ft)
- Lowest elevation: 150 m (490 ft)
- Population (approx.): 715
- Website: http://borkowo.tnb.pl

Borkowo [bɔrˈkɔvɔ] is a village in the administrative district of Gmina Kolno, within Kolno County, Podlaskie Voivodeship, in north-eastern Poland.
