= Truszki =

Truszki may refer to the following places:

- Truszki, Masovian Voivodeship (east-central Poland)
- Truszki, Gmina Piątnica in Podlaskie Voivodeship (northeast Poland)
- Truszki, Gmina Śniadowo in Podlaskie Voivodeship (northeast Poland)

== See also ==
- Truszki-Kucze in Podlaskie Voivodeship (north-eastern Poland)
- Truszki-Patory in Podlaskie Voivodeship (north-eastern Poland)
- Truszki-Zalesie in Podlaskie Voivodeship (north-eastern Poland)
