= Kozioł, Podlaskie Voivodeship =

Kozioł
- Village
- Location within Poland
- Coordinates: 53°25′N 21°49′E
- Country: Poland
- Voivodeship: Podlaskie
- County: Kolno
- Gmina: Gmina Kolno
- Population: 333

Kozioł [ˈkɔʑɔu̯] is a village in the administrative district of Gmina Kolno, within Kolno County, Podlaskie Voivodeship, in north-eastern Poland.
