= Mały Płock =

- Village
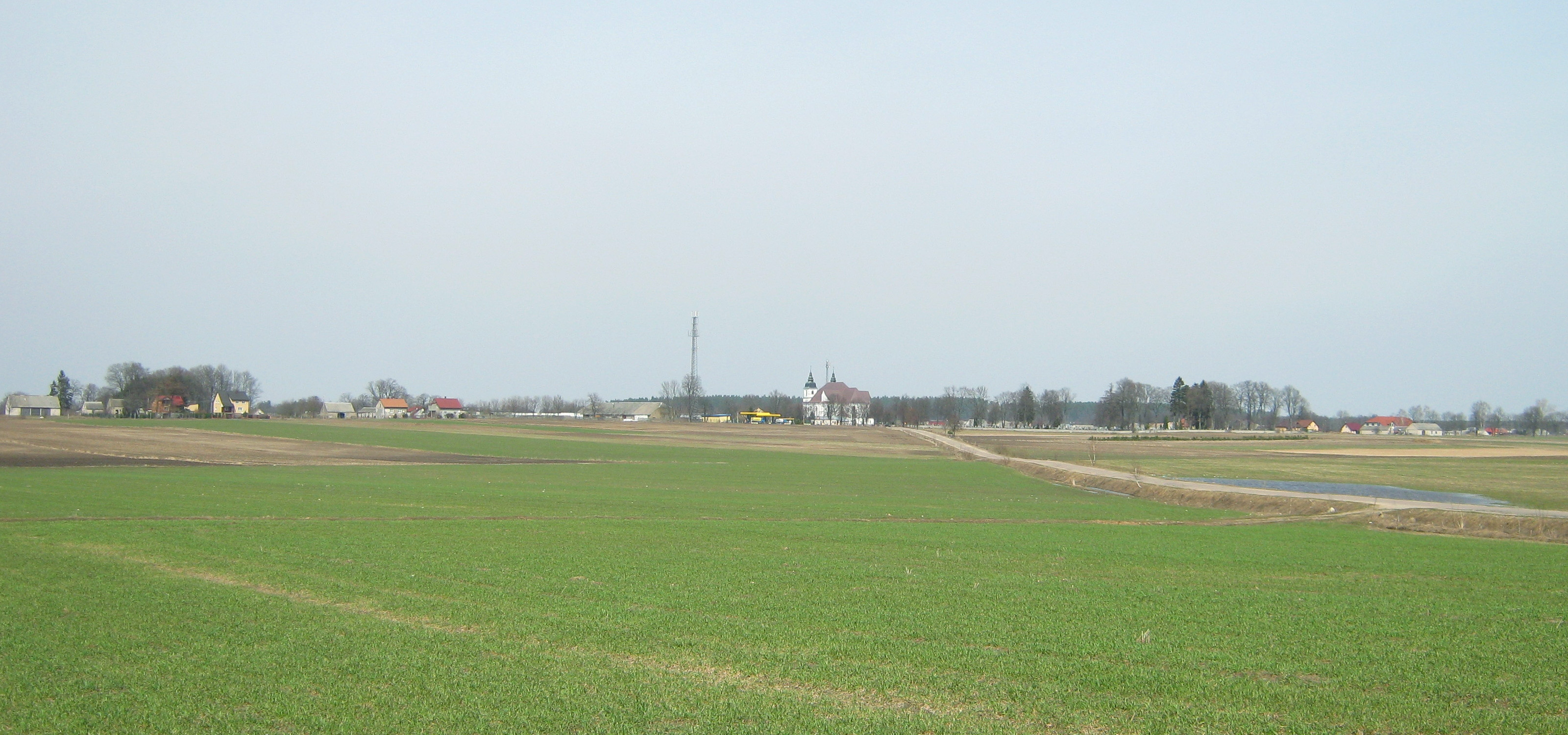
- Mały Płock seen from a distance

- Location within Poland
- Coordinates: 53°18′N 22°1′E
- Country: Poland
- Voivodeship: Podlaskie
- County: Kolno
- Gmina: Mały Płock
- Population: 1,051
- Website: http://www.malyplock.pl/

Mały Płock [ˈmawɨ ˈpwɔt͡sk] is a village in Kolno County, Podlaskie Voivodeship, in north-eastern Poland. It is the seat of the gmina (administrative district) called Gmina Mały Płock.

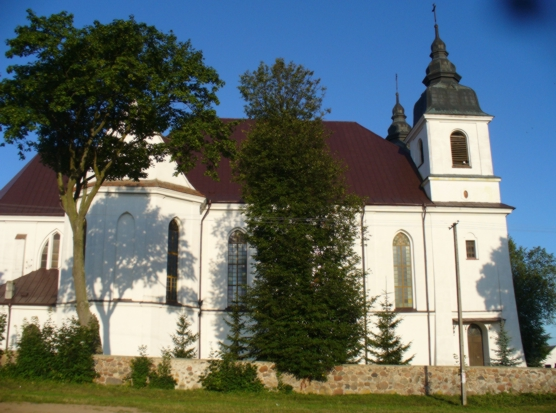
The Church of the Finding of the True Cross in Mały Płock
