= Gmina Mały Płock =

Gmina Mały Płock Mały Płock Commune
- Gmina
- Flag Coat of arms

- Gmina Mały Płock within the Kolno County
- Coordinates (Mały Płock): 53°18′N 22°1′E
- Country: Poland
- Voivodeship: Podlaskie
- County: Kolno
- Seat: Mały Płock

Area
  - Total: 140.06 km^{2} (54.08 sq mi)

Population (2011)
  - Total: 5,051
  - Density: 36.06/km^{2} (93.40/sq mi)
- Website: http://www.malyplock.pl

Gmina Mały Płock is a rural gmina (administrative district) in Kolno County, Podlaskie Voivodeship, in north-eastern Poland. Its seat is the village of Mały Płock, which lies approximately 14 kilometres (9 mi) south-east of Kolno and 80 km (50 mi) west of the regional capital Białystok.

The gmina covers an area of 140.06 square kilometres (54.1 sq mi), and as of 2006 its total population is 5,019 (5,051 in 2011).

== Villages ==
Gmina Mały Płock contains the villages and settlements of Budy Żelazne, Budy-Kozłówka, Chludnie, Cwaliny Duże, Cwaliny Małe, Józefowo, Kąty, Kołaki-Strumienie, Kołaki-Wietrzychowo, Korzeniste, Krukówka, Mały Płock, Mściwuje, Nowe Rakowo, Popki, Rogienice Piaseczne, Rogienice Wielkie, Rogienice-Wypychy, Ruda-Skroda, Rudka-Skroda, Śmiarowo, Stare Rakowo, Waśki, Włodki, Wygrane and Zalesie.

== Neighbouring gminas ==
Gmina Mały Płock is bordered by the gminas of Kolno, Łomża, Nowogród, Piątnica, Stawiski and Zbójna.

== Notable people ==
- Anzia Yezierska
