= Gmina Turośl =

Gmina Turośl Turośl Commune
- Gmina
- Gmina Turośl within the Kolno County
- Coordinates (Turośl): 53°23′N 21°43′E
- Country: Poland
- Voivodeship: Podlaskie
- County: Kolno
- Seat: Turośl

Area
  - Total: 198.43 km^{2} (76.61 sq mi)

Population (2014)
  - Total: 5,910
  - Density: 29.8/km^{2} (77.1/sq mi)
- Website: http://www.turosl.pl

Gmina Turośl is a rural gmina (administrative district) in Kolno County, Podlaskie Voivodeship, in north-eastern Poland. Its seat is the village of Turośl, which lies approximately 15 kilometres (9 mi) west of Kolno and 102 km (63 mi) west of the regional capital Białystok.

The gmina covers an area of 198.43 square kilometres (76.6 sq mi), and as of 2014 its total population is 5,910.

== Villages ==
Gmina Turośl contains the villages and settlements of Adamusy, Charubin, Charubiny, Cieciory, Cieloszka, Dudy Nadrzeczne, Krusza, Ksebki, Łacha, Leman, Nowa Ruda, Popiołki, Potasie, Ptaki, Pudełko, Pupki, Samule, Szablaki, Trzcińskie, Turośl, Wanacja and Zimna.

== Neighbouring gminas ==
Gmina Turośl is bordered by the gminas of Kolno, Łyse, Pisz and Zbójna.
