= Gmina Grabowo =

Gmina Grabowo Grabowo Commune
- Gmina
- Gmina Grabowo within the Kolno County
- Coordinates (Grabowo): 53°27′N 22°9′E
- Country: Poland
- Voivodeship: Podlaskie
- County: Kolno
- Seat: Grabowo

Area
  - Total: 128.48 km^{2} (49.61 sq mi)

Population (2011)
  - Total: 3,658
  - Density: 28.47/km^{2} (73.74/sq mi)

Gmina Grabowo is a rural gmina (administrative district) in Kolno County, Podlaskie Voivodeship, in north-eastern Poland. Its seat is the village of Grabowo, which lies approximately 15 kilometres (9 mi) east of Kolno and 78 km (48 mi) north-west of the regional capital Białystok.

The gmina covers an area of 128.48 square kilometres (49.6 sq mi), and as of 2006 its total population is 3,637 (3,658 in 2011).

== Villages ==
Gmina Grabowo contains the villages and settlements of Andrychy, Bagińskie, Borzymy, Chełchy, Ciemianka, Dąbrowa, Gałązki, Gnatowo, Golanki, Grabowo, Grabowskie, Grądy-Michały, Grądy-Możdżenie, Guty Podleśne, Jadłówek, Kamińskie, Konopki-Białystok, Konopki-Monety, Kownacin, Kurkowo, Łebki Duże, Łebki Małe, Łubiane, Marki, Milewo-Gałązki, Pasichy, Przyborowo, Rosochate, Siwki, Skroda Wielka, Stare Guty, Stawiane, Surały, Świdry Podleśne, Świdry-Dobrzyce, Wiszowate, Wojsławy and Żebrki.

== Neighbouring gminas ==
Gmina Grabowo is bordered by the gminas of Biała Piska, Kolno, Przytuły, Stawiski, Szczuczyn and Wąsosz.
