= Wszebory, Podlaskie Voivodeship =

Wszebory
- Village
- Location within Poland
- Coordinates: 53°27′N 21°58′E
- Country: Poland
- Voivodeship: Podlaskie
- County: Kolno
- Gmina: Gmina Kolno
- Population: 87

Wszebory [fʂɛˈbɔrɨ] is a village in the administrative district of Gmina Kolno, within Kolno County, Podlaskie Voivodeship, in north-eastern Poland.
