= Lachowo =

- Village
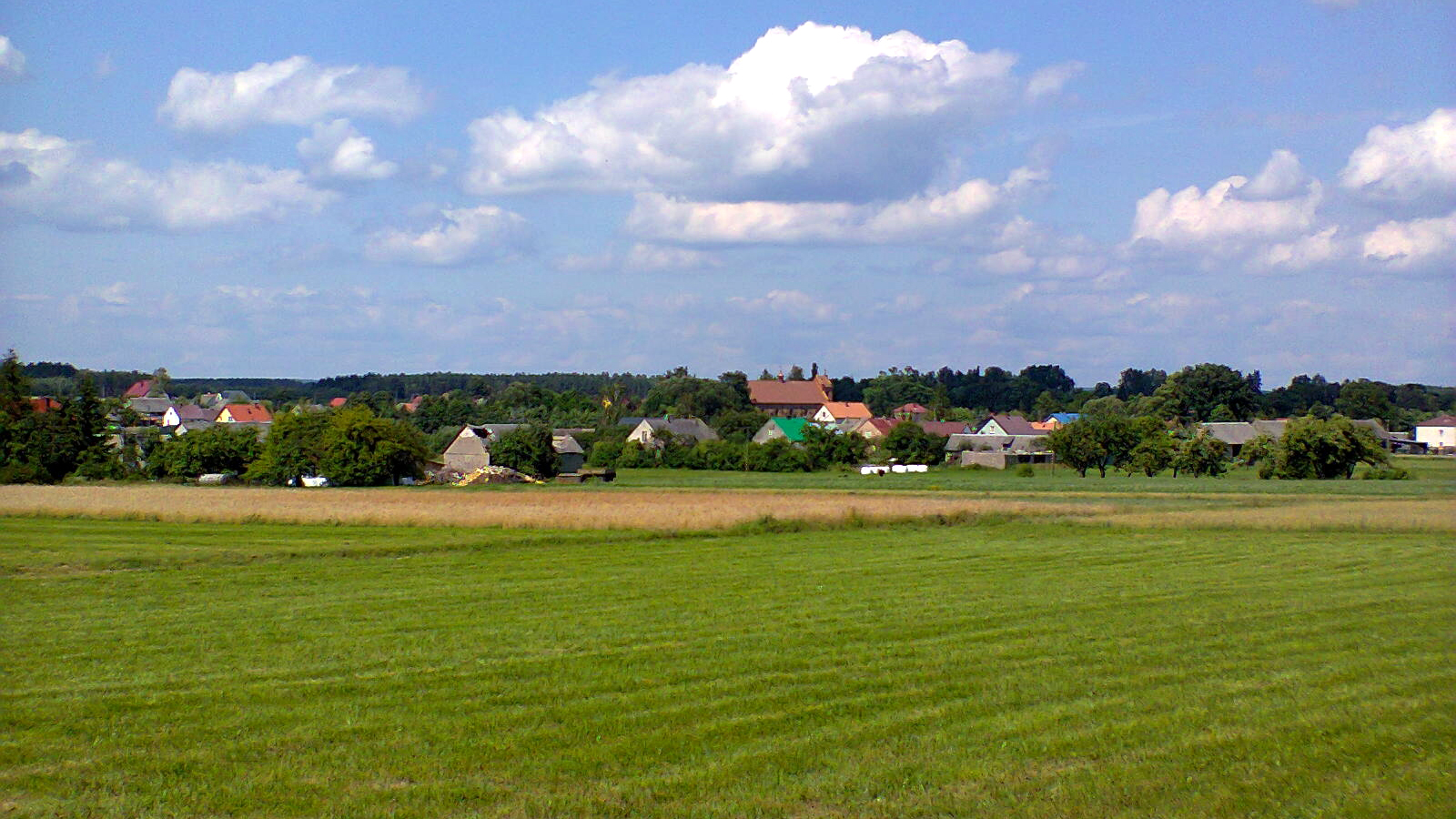

- Location within Poland
- Coordinates: 53°28′N 22°1′E
- Country: Poland
- Voivodeship: Podlaskie
- County: Kolno
- Gmina: Gmina Kolno

Population
  - Total: 506
- Time zone: UTC+1 (CET)
  - Summer (DST): UTC+2 (CEST)
- Vehicle registration: BKL
- Website: http://www.splachowo.ovh.org

Lachowo [laˈxɔvɔ] is a village in the administrative district of Gmina Kolno, within Kolno County, Podlaskie Voivodeship, in north-eastern Poland.

== History ==
Following the German-Soviet invasion of Poland, which started World War II in September 1939, the village was initially occupied by the Soviet Union until 1941, and then by Germany. Afterwards, Lachowo was restored to Poland, although with a Soviet-installed communist regime, which stayed in power until the Fall of Communism in the 1980s. The Polish anti-communist resistance was active in Lachowo, and in 1945–1947, it carried out two raids on the local communist police station.
