= Kolno County =

Kolno County Powiat kolneński
- County
- Flag Coat of arms

- Coordinates (Kolno): 53°24′38″N 21°56′2″E
- Country: Poland
- Voivodeship: Podlaskie
- Seat: Kolno
- Gminas: Total 6 (incl. 1 urban): Kolno; Gmina Grabowo; Gmina Kolno; Gmina Mały Płock; Gmina Stawiski; Gmina Turośl

Area
  - Total: 939.73 km^{2} (362.83 sq mi)

Population (2019)
  - Total: 38,249
  - Density: 40.702/km^{2} (105.42/sq mi)
  - Urban: 12,388
  - Rural: 25,861
- Car plates: BKL
- Website: www.powiatkolno.home.pl

Kolno County (Polish: powiat kolneński) is a unit of territorial administration and local government (powiat) in Podlaskie Voivodeship, north-eastern Poland. It came into being on January 1, 1999, as a result of the Polish local government reforms passed in 1998. Its administrative seat and largest town is Kolno, which lies 89 kilometres (55 mi) west of the regional capital Białystok. The only other town in the county is Stawiski, lying 16 km (10 mi) east of Kolno.

The county covers an area of 939.73 square kilometres (362.8 sq mi). As of 2019 its total population is 38,249, out of which the population of Kolno is 10,214, that of Stawiski is 2,174, and the rural population is 25,861.

== Neighbouring counties ==
Kolno County is bordered by Pisz County to the north, Grajewo County to the north-east, Łomża County to the south and Ostrołęka County to the west.

== Administrative divisions ==
The county is subdivided into six gminas (one urban, one urban-rural and four rural). These are listed in the following table, in descending order of population.

Gmina	Type	Area (km^{2})	Population (2019)	Seat
Kolno	urban	25.1	10,214	
Gmina Kolno	rural	282.1	8,601	Kolno *
Gmina Stawiski	urban-rural	165.6	6,105	Stawiski
Gmina Turośl	rural	198.4	5,113	Turośl
Gmina Mały Płock	rural	140.1	4,759	Mały Płock
Gmina Grabowo	rural	128.5	3,457	Grabowo
* seat not part of the gmina
