= 14th Horse Artillery Divizion (Poland) =

- 14 Dywizjon Artylerii Konnej
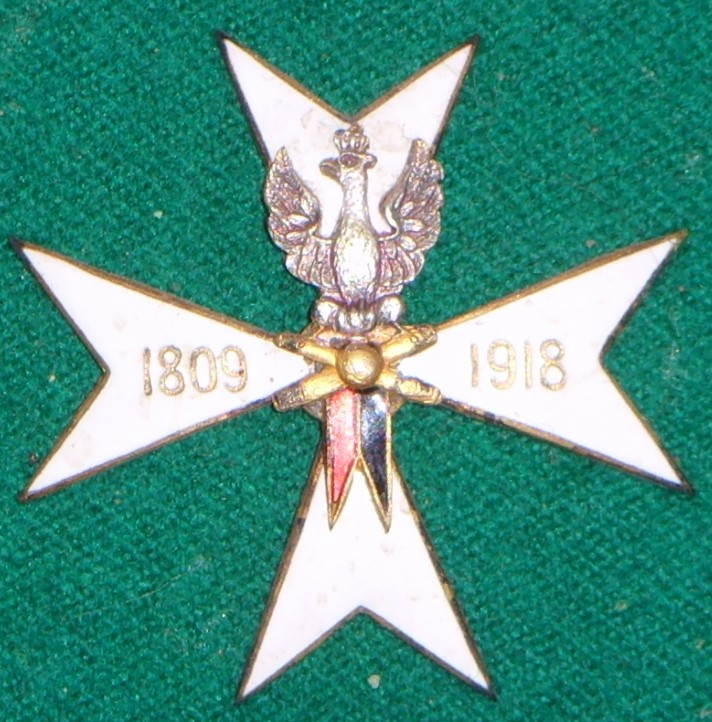
- Active: 1920-1939
- Allegiance: Second Polish Republic
- Branch: Polish Armed Forces
- Type: Cavalry
- Part of: Podlaska Cavalry Brigade
- Garrison/HQ: Białystok: Polish–Soviet War; World War II: Battle of Kock

14th Horse Artillery Divizion (Polish: 14 Dywizjon Artylerii Konnej) was a horse artillery unit of the Polish Armed Forces of the Second Polish Republic. The unit was formed in Góra Kalwaria on July 14, 1920 as the 9th Horse Artillery Division. During the Polish-Bolshevik War, its 1st battery fought in the defense of Warsaw, participated in the expedition beyond Słucz, where it fought at Rohaczew and Ostróżek. In peacetime, the division changed its name twice: in 1921 to 8 dak, and in 1927 to 14th Horse Artillery Division. The unit was stationed in Corps District No. III (battery 3 in Ostrołęka in Corps District No. I in the Białystok garrison. In terms of professional training, the division was subordinate to the commander of the 3rd Artillery Group. During the September Campaign, it fought as part of the parent Podlaska Cavalry Brigade.

== History ==
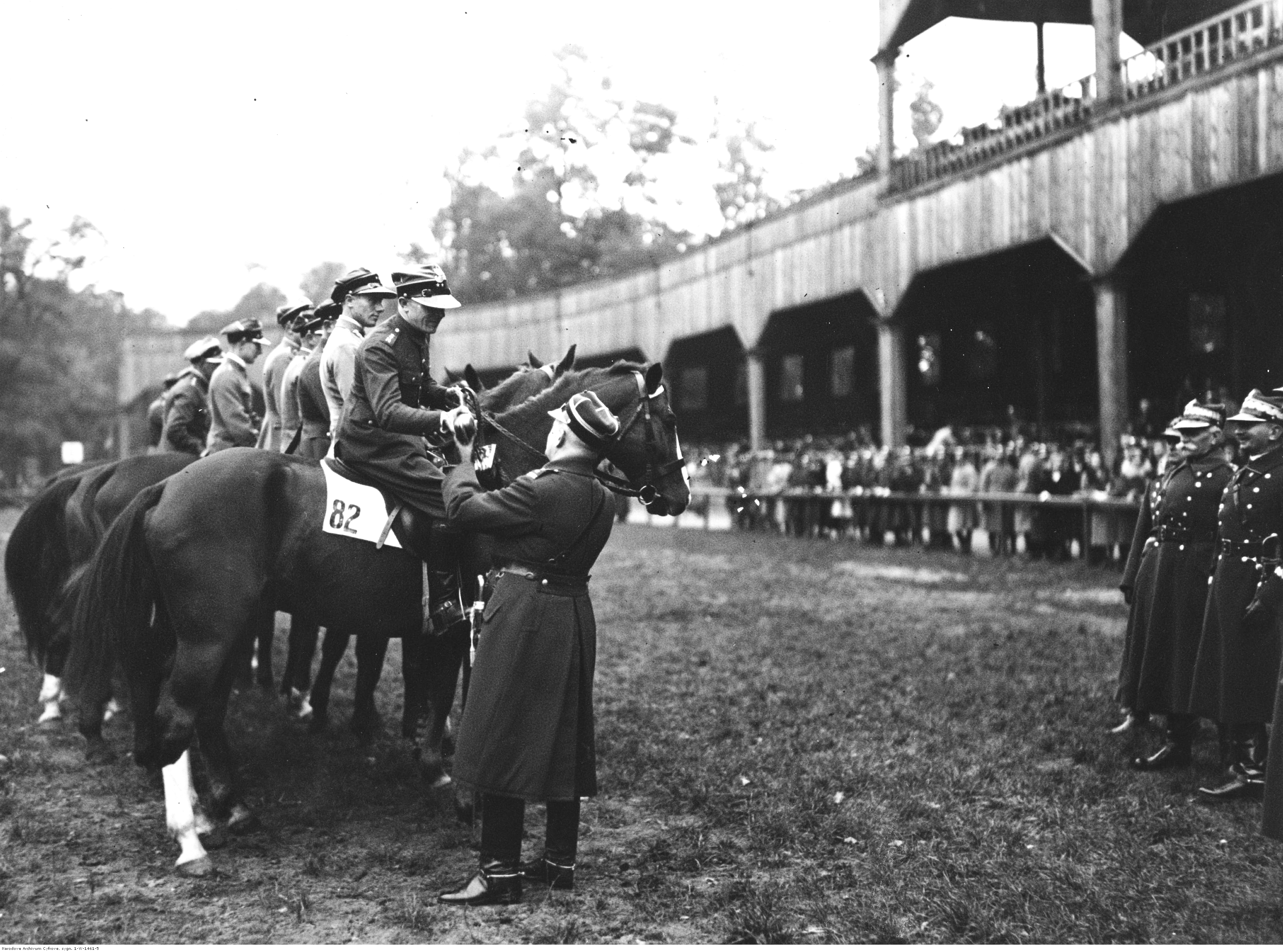
The Equestrian Association of Horse Artillery Officers Competition in Warsaw 1931 – Col. Jan Maciej Bold presents the award to the winner of the opening competition, Lt. Ludwik Pyrowicz from the 14th Artillery Regiment

In June 1920, a decision was made to form a horse artillery division for the 9th Cavalry Brigade. Lieutenant Colonel Czesław Tabortowski was appointed its commander. The new cavalry division was to be organized in the reserve battery of the horse artillery in Góra Kalwaria. In the same month, in Kraków, the organization of the "Kraków battery" began, but at the beginning of August, a decision was made to transfer it to Góra Kalwaria, include it in the 9th cavalry division and rename it its 1st battery. Although the battery did not reach full march readiness in August, due to the approach of Bolshevik troops to Warsaw, it was used to defend the capital.

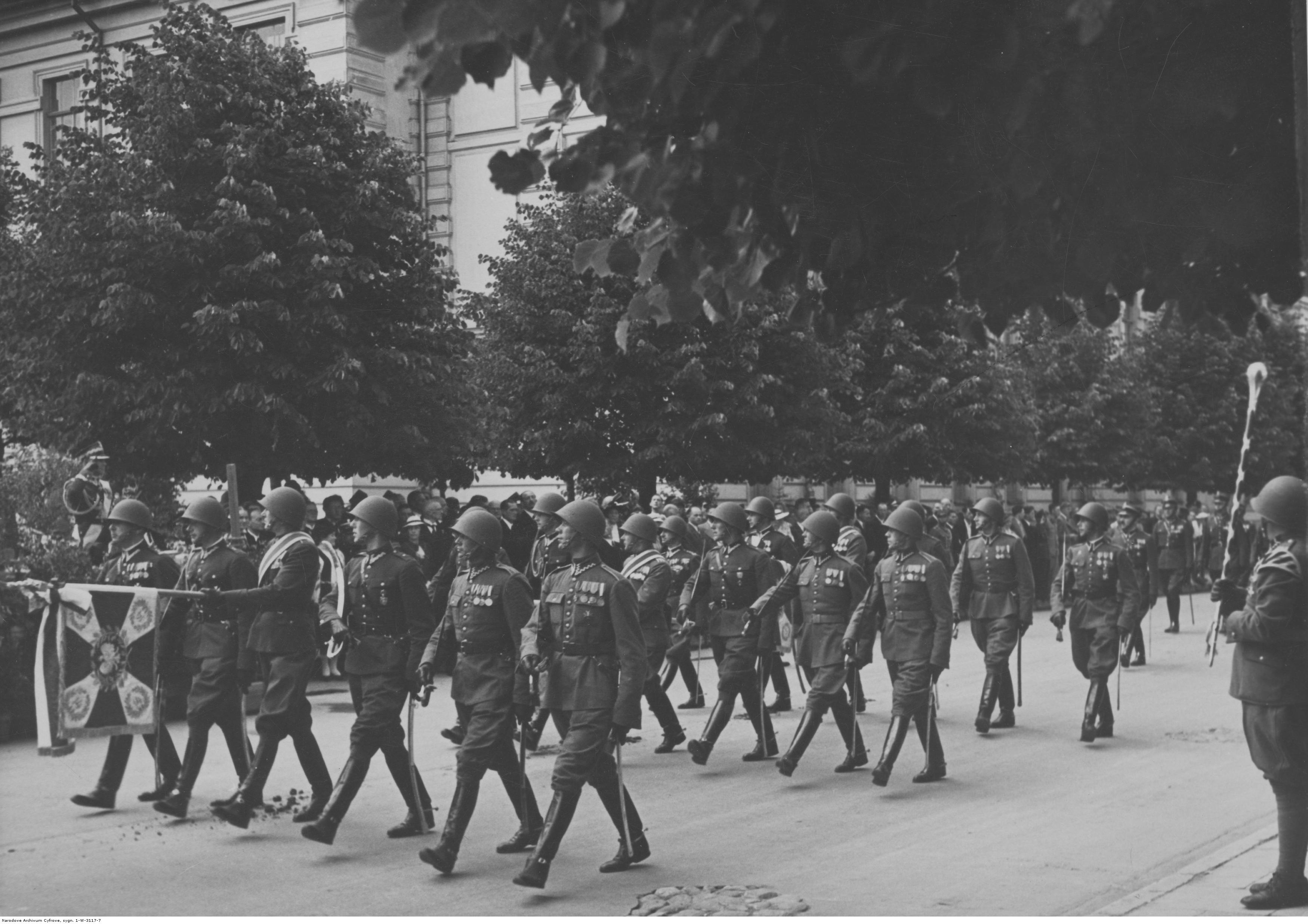
Presentation of banners donated by the people of the Vilnius region to artillery regiments in Vilnius – parade of the dismounted colour guard of the 14th Horse Artillery Division; July 3, 1938

At the end of August, the division command reached operational readiness. In September, the single-battery 9th cavalry division was transported by train to Volhynia and incorporated into the structures of the 9th Cavalry Brigade. Major fighting did not occur until the drive to Korosten. During this period, the artillery supported cavalry regiments fighting on the Słucza River and repelling Soviet counterattacks. On 27 September, the 1/9th cavalry division distinguished itself in the battle for Roháczów, and on 1–2 October, near Ostróżko. The division ended its combat tour in the Korosten region. After the end of hostilities, the 9th cavalry division was quartered in the Przeworsk region. In May 1921, it was transported by rail to Białystok and deployed in the barracks of the 4th Mariampolsky Hussar Regiment at 100 Bema Street. A month later, at the request of Colonel Gustaw Orlicz-Dreszer, it was renamed the 8th cavalry division.

On 27 April 1922, its 1st battery was transferred to the 10th cavalry division, and a new battery was created in Białystok in its place. A similar fate befell the 2nd Battery, which in 1924 was transferred to the 12th Horse Artillery Division. In the same year, the 3rd Battery was disbanded. Almost throughout the interwar period, the division was a two-battery unit. It consisted of the commander's squad, the communications platoon, the quartermaster's office, and the 1st and 2nd batteries. The 3rd Battery was recreated only in 1937 in Ostrołęka on the basis of the 2nd battery of the disbanded 12th Horse Artillery Regiment. Due to the limited space in Białystok, it continued to be stationed in Ostrołęka in the barracks of the 5th Uhlan Regiment. In 1927, by order of the 3rd Artillery Department of the MSWojsk. L. 2000/Org. og., the 8th Horse Artillery Regiment was renamed the 14th Horse Artillery Regiment.

During the interwar period, the division changed its subordination several times. From April to October 1921 it was part of the 2nd Horse Artillery Regiment. Then it was subordinated to the command of the 8th Cavalry Brigade, and from 1924 – to the 1st Cavalry Division. In 1929 the division became part of the "Białystok" Cavalry Brigade, renamed in 1937 to the Podlaska Cavalry Brigade.

=== Mobilization ===
The mobilization of the division began on August 24, 1939, as part of the alarm mobilization, in the yellow group from A+20 to A+24 in Białystok. The 3rd battery with the ammunition column platoon mobilized in Ostrołęka, in the same group, on A+20, by the 5th Uhlan Regiment. Additionally, in the same group, from A+36 to A+42, the 14th Cavalry Brigade mobilized for the Podlaska Cavalry Brigade in Białystok:

- Arms Park Squad No. 343 (Polish: drużynę parkową uzbrojenia nr 343)
- Cavalry Wagon Column Type II No. 356 (Polish: kolumnę taborową kawaleryjską typ II nr 356)
- Cavalry Wagon Column Type II No. 357 (Polish: kolumnę taborową kawaleryjską typ II nr 357)
- Wagon Workshop No. 343 (Polish: warsztat taborowy nr 343)

As part of the first wave of general mobilization, by September 5 the division was mobilized. The mobilization went without any major problems, except for the horse-drawn wagons, which were of poor quality and required repairs, and too small and had little load capacity, which delayed the achievement of march readiness by the ammunition column of the division. Some of the units were mobilizing, from the afternoon hours outside the garrison, e.g. 1st battery in the village of Porosły west of Białystok. On the night of 25/26 August, the division, consisting of two batteries, marched from Białystok to Jeżewo Stare, stopping in Pokrzywnica for a day stop. On the night of 26/27 August, the 14th division marched towards Jedwabne, arriving there on 27 August, then moved to the concentration area of the Podlaska Cavalry Brigade in Wilamowo – Stawiski – Poryte – Jurzec, north of Łomża, and together with the remaining units of the brigade became part of the Independent Operational Group Narew. On 27 and 28 August, the locations of observation points and firing positions were reconnoitred in the brigade's defense zone. On August 29, the batteries were sent to the staging areas of the cavalry regiments, the 1st battery joined the 9th Mounted Rifle Regiment in the area of the village of Jurzec, and the 2nd battery joined the 10th Uhlan Regiment in the area of the towns of Orlikowo, Kossaki. On August 29, at 3 p.m., the 3rd Battery set off from Ostrołęka with the 5th Uhlan Regiment and stopped for a rest in the Morgowniki forest west of Nowogród. On August 30 in the evening, the division marched along the Kąty, Korzeniste, Poryte route to the Budy Stawiskie, where the division reached on August 31 before dawn. In the September campaign, the division, consisting of three batteries, fought as part of the Podlaska Cavalry Brigade.
