= Ramoty =

Ramoty may refer to the following places:

- Ramoty, Podlaskie Voivodeship (north-east Poland)
- Ramoty, Pomeranian Voivodeship (north Poland)
- Ramoty, Warmian-Masurian Voivodeship (north Poland)
