= Dzierzbia (river) =

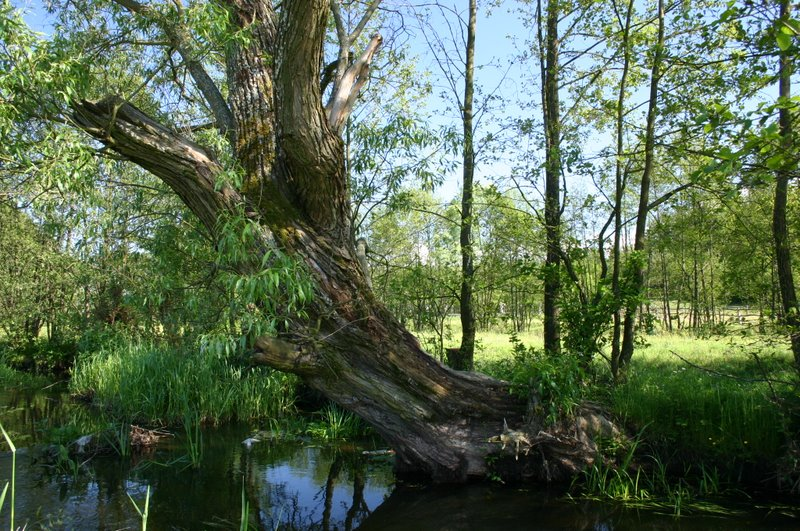

Location
- Country: Poland

Physical characteristics
- Mouth
  - location: Skroda
  - coordinates: 53.3787°N 22.0352°E

Basin features
- Progression: Skroda→ Pisa→ Narew→ Vistula→ Baltic Sea

Uroczysko Dzierzbia nature reserve
- Dzierzbia river wilderness
- Interactive map of Uroczysko Dzierzbia nature reserve
- Location: Podlaskie Voivodeship, Poland
- Area: 7,180 km^{2} (2,770 sq mi)
- Established: 2001
- Governing body: Nadleśnictwo Łomża

Dzierzbia [ˈd͡ʑɛʐbja] is a small river in north-eastern Poland, flowing within the administrative district of Gmina Stawiski in Kolno County, Podlaskie Voivodeship. It is being fed by several local streams. Dzierzbia is a right-tributary of another small river called Skroda, which begins near the village of Andrychy and empties into Pisa river near the town of Rudka-Skroda.

In 2001, a nature reserve has been established along Dzierzbia. It is called the Rezerwat "Uroczysko Dzierzbia" (Uroczysko Dzierzbia Nature Reserve, or Dzierzbia River Wilderness Reserve), located also within Gmina Stawiski. The reserve has been created for the protection of deciduous forest with a high level of natural purity. Main ecosystems include ash-alder wetlands (Circaeo-Alnetum), chickweed-alder wetlands (Stellario - Alnetum), European Fen-Alder (Carici elongatae-Alnetum), typical broadleaf forest (Tilio-Carpinetum), mixed forest (Melitti-Carpinetum), and bright oak wood (Potentillo albae - Quercetum).

The Uroczysko Dzierzbia Nature reserve is maintained and supervised by Forest District Office in Łomża (Nadleśnictwo Łomża).

== See also ==
- Rivers of Poland
- List of rivers of Poland
- Geography of Poland

== Notes and references ==
Media related to Uroczysko Dzierzbia at Wikimedia Commons

- Rezerwaty nadleśnictwa Łomża
