= Żelazki =

Żelazki may refer to the following places:

- Żelazki, Podlaskie Voivodeship (north-east Poland)
- Żelazki, Warmian-Masurian Voivodeship (north Poland)
- Żelazki, Gołdap County in Warmian-Masurian Voivodeship (north Poland)
