= Karwowo, Kolno County =

Karwowo
- Village
- Location within Poland
- Coordinates: 53°19′N 22°8′E
- Country: Poland
- Voivodeship: Podlaskie
- County: Kolno
- Gmina: Stawiski
- Population: 172

Karwowo [karˈvɔvɔ] is a village in the administrative district of Gmina Stawiski, within Kolno County, Podlaskie Voivodeship, in north-eastern Poland.
