= Sokoły, Kolno County =

Sokoły
- Village
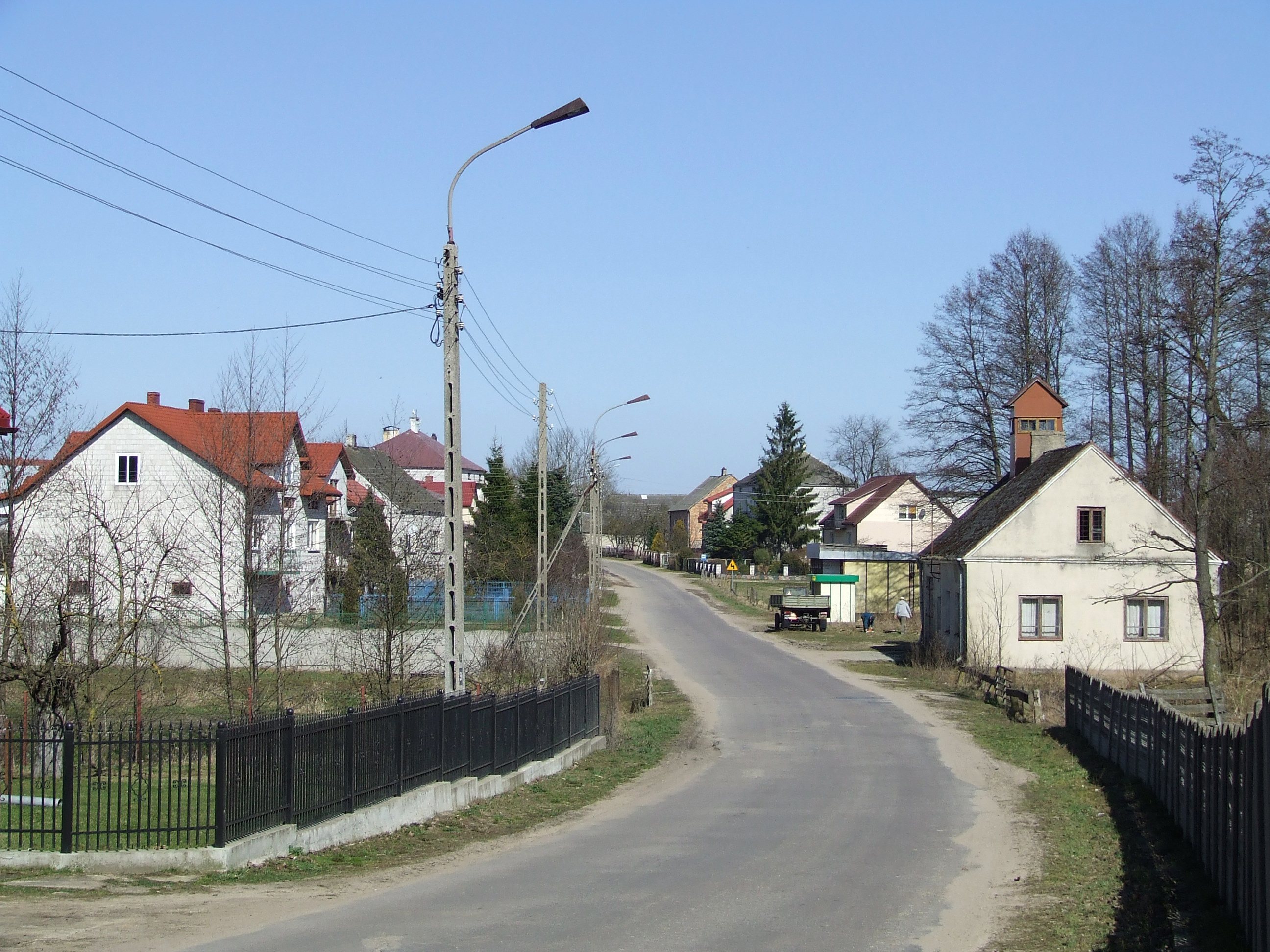

- Location within Poland
- Coordinates: 53°24′09″N 22°05′54″E
- Country: Poland
- Voivodeship: Podlaskie
- County: Kolno
- Gmina: Stawiski

Sokoły [sɔˈkɔwɨ] is a village in the administrative district of Gmina Stawiski, within Kolno County, Podlaskie Voivodeship, in north-eastern Poland.
