= Lisy, Podlaskie Voivodeship =

Lisy
- Village
- Location within Poland
- Coordinates: 53°22′N 22°13′E
- Country: Poland
- Voivodeship: Podlaskie
- County: Kolno
- Gmina: Stawiski
- Population: 51

Lisy [ˈlisɨ] is a village in the administrative district of Gmina Stawiski, within Kolno County, Podlaskie Voivodeship, in north-eastern Poland.
