= Wysokie Małe =

- Village
- Location within Poland
- Coordinates: 53°18′N 22°7′E
- Country: Poland
- Voivodeship: Podlaskie
- County: Kolno
- Gmina: Stawiski

Population
  - Total: 87
- Postal code: 18-520
- Vehicle registration: BKL

Wysokie Małe [vɨˈsɔkʲɛ ˈmawɛ] is a village in the administrative district of Gmina Stawiski, within Kolno County, Podlaskie Voivodeship, in north-eastern Poland.

Five Polish citizens were murdered by Nazi Germany in the village during World War II.
