= Poryte Małe =

- Village
- Location within Poland
- Coordinates: 53°21′05″N 22°04′56″E
- Country: Poland
- Voivodeship: Podlaskie
- County: Kolno
- Gmina: Stawiski

Poryte Małe [pɔˈrɨtɛ ˈmawɛ] is a village in the administrative district of Gmina Stawiski, within Kolno County, Podlaskie Voivodeship, in north-eastern Poland.
