= Cedry =

- Village
- Location within Poland
- Coordinates: 53°21′N 22°11′E
- Country: Poland
- Voivodeship: Podlaskie
- County: Kolno
- Gmina: Stawiski
- Population: 168

Cedry [ˈt͡sɛdrɨ] is a village in the administrative district of Gmina Stawiski, within Kolno County, Podlaskie Voivodeship, in north-eastern Poland.
