= Zalesie, Gmina Stawiski =

Zalesie
- Village
- Location within Poland
- Coordinates: 53°18′31″N 22°8′25″E
- Country: Poland
- Voivodeship: Podlaskie
- County: Kolno
- Gmina: Stawiski
- Population: 27

Zalesie [zaˈlɛɕɛ] is a village in the administrative district of Gmina Stawiski, within Kolno County, Podlaskie Voivodeship, in north-eastern Poland.
