= Poryte Szlacheckie =

- Village
- Location within Poland
- Coordinates: 53°21′N 22°4′E
- Country: Poland
- Voivodeship: Podlaskie
- County: Kolno
- Gmina: Stawiski
- Website: http://poryte.4lomza.pl

Poryte Szlacheckie [pɔˈrɨtɛ ʂlaˈxɛt͡skʲɛ] is a village in the administrative district of Gmina Stawiski, within Kolno County, Podlaskie Voivodeship, in north-eastern Poland.
