= Barzykowo =

- Village
- Location within Poland
- Coordinates: 53°24′N 22°7′E
- Country: Poland
- Voivodeship: Podlaskie
- County: Kolno
- Gmina: Stawiski
- Population: 195

Barzykowo [baʐɨˈkɔvɔ] is a village in the administrative district of Gmina Stawiski, within Kolno County, Podlaskie Voivodeship, in north-eastern Poland.
