= Stawiski =

Town in Poland

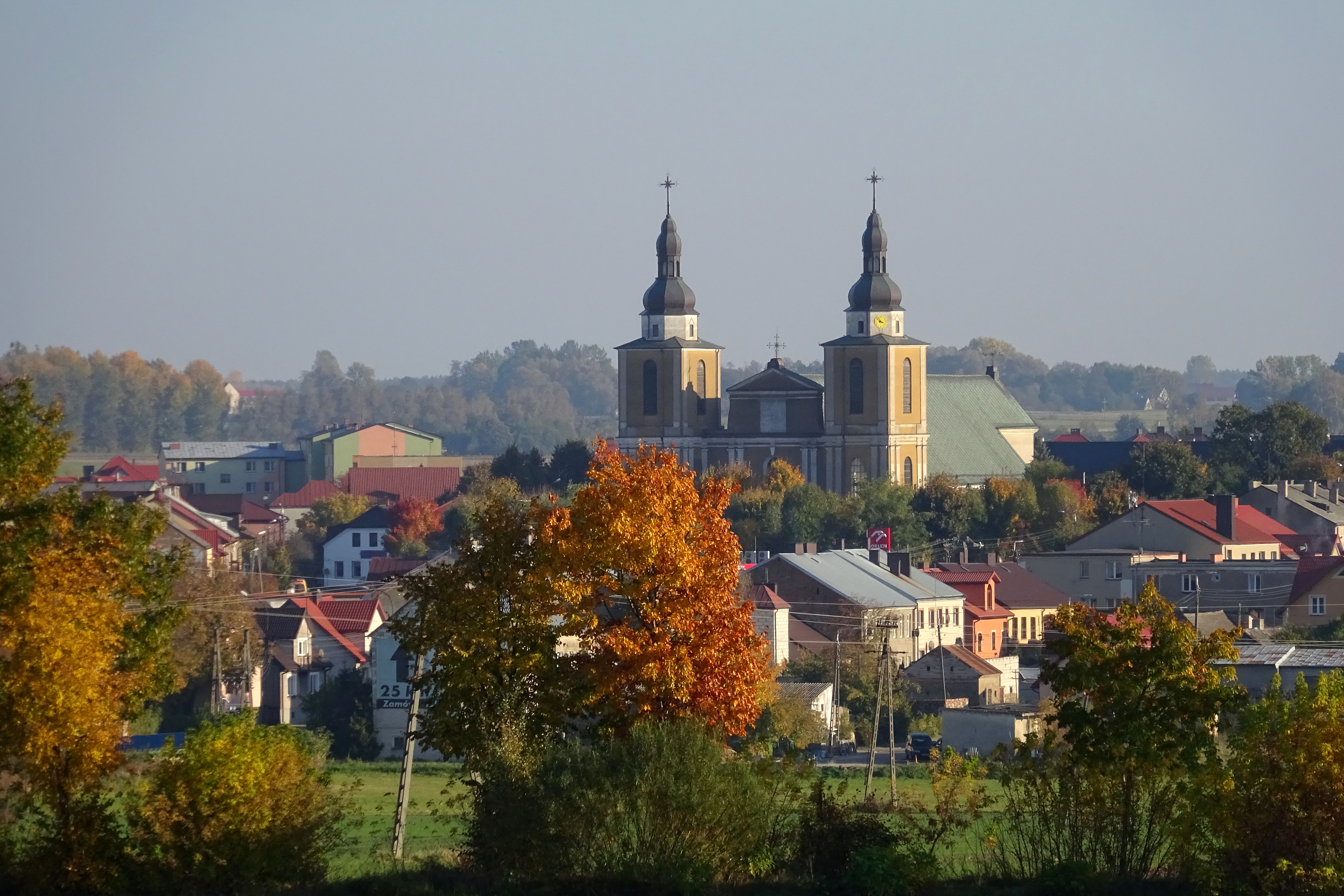
- Stawiski panorama with the view of Saint Anthony church

- Coat of arms

- Location within Poland
- Coordinates: 53°23′N 22°10′E
- Country: Poland
- Voivodeship: Podlaskie
- County: Kolno
- Gmina: Stawiski

Area
  - Total: 13.28 km^{2} (5.13 sq mi)

Population (2006)
  - Total: 2,442
  - Density: 183.9/km^{2} (476.3/sq mi)
- Time zone: UTC+1 (CET)
  - Summer (DST): UTC+2 (CEST)
- Postal code: 18-520
- Vehicle registration: BKL
- Website: www.stawiski.pl

Stawiski [staˈvʲiskʲi] is a town in northeastern Poland, situated within Kolno County, in Podlaskie Voivodeship, approximately 16 kilometres (10 miles) east of Kolno and 74 kilometres (46 miles) west of the regional capital Białystok. Stawiski is the administrative seat of Gmina Stawiski. The town is situated on the Dzierzbia River.

According to Central Statistical Office (Poland), the population of Stawiski as of 31 December 2008 was 2,417 persons.

== History ==
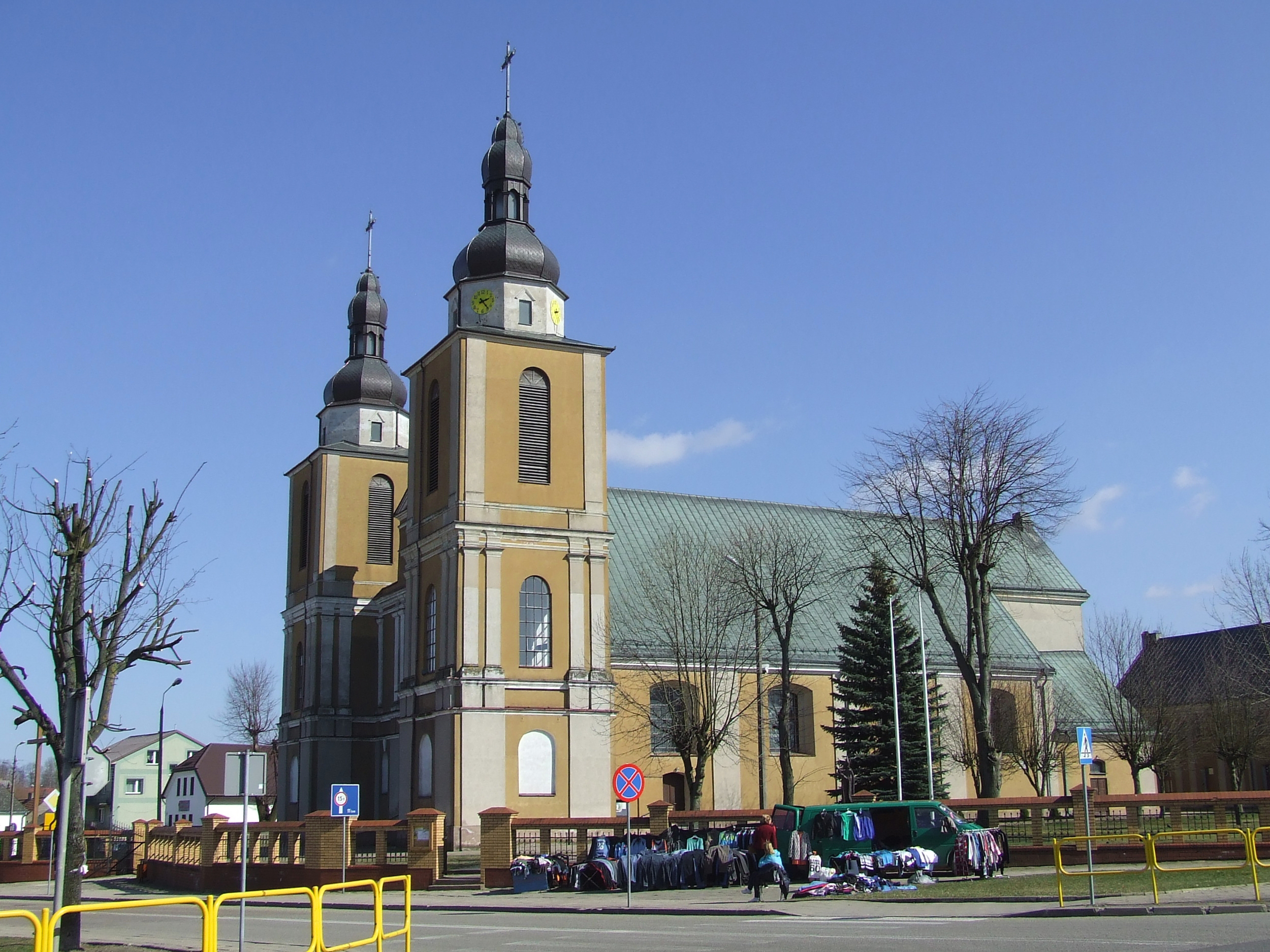
Baroque Saint Anthony church

Stawiski was established in 1407–1411. It received town rights around 1688. The Franciscan Order built a monastery there in 1791.

Following the Third Partition of Poland, the town was annexed by Prussia. In 1807, it was regained by Poles and included within the short-lived Duchy of Warsaw, and after the dissolution of the duchy in 1815, the town became part of Russian-controlled Congress Poland. The town was destroyed by fire in 1812 in the course of the French campaign against Russia, and rebuilt again, to become a trade and commercial centre known for its furs, fabrics and hats in Congress Poland. Local monks were expelled from Stawiski in 1867 during, as punishment for supporting the Polish January Uprising against the Russian imperial rule. Stawiski burned to the ground once more during the Russian–German war of 1915, soon before the re-establishment of the sovereign Republic of Poland. The Polish army fought a battle against Soviet Russia there in July 1920 during the Polish-Soviet War.

During the German-Soviet invasion of Poland which started World War II in September 1939, the town was captured by Germany, and then handed over to the Soviet Union in accordance with the Molotov–Ribbentrop Pact. It was then occupied by the Soviet Union until 1941, and Germany until 1944. A local Polish policeman was murdered by the Russians in the Katyn massacre in 1940. Afterwards it was restored to Poland, although with a Soviet-installed communist regime, which remained in power until the Fall of Communism in the end of the 1980s. On 6 May 1945, the Polish anti-communist resistance clashed with Soviet officers in Stawiski. In 1945–1947, the resistance also carried out four raids on the local communist police station.

From 1946 to 1975 it belonged administratively to Białystok Voivodeship, and from 1975 to 1998 to Łomża Voivodeship.

=== Jewish community ===
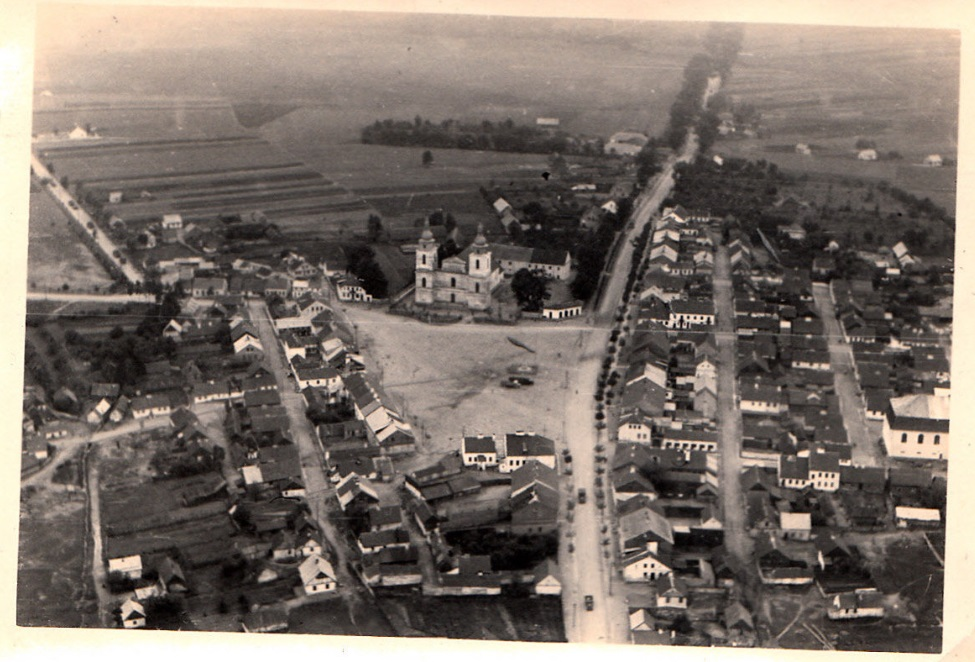
Aerial photo of Stawiski from the period of World War II. In the background, the church of St. Anthony and the Great Synagogue.

Jewish life in Stawiski had been separate from that of the rest of the town's inhabitants. The Jews had established many institutions of their own, including synagogues and Jewish schools and libraries. By 1932, over 50% of Stawiski's population, some 2,000 persons, was Jewish.

During the Invasion of Poland in September 1939, Stawiski was initially occupied by Germany. During the month-long German occupation, German soldiers raped Jewish women and plundered Jewish property. Some Poles who had been ordered to supervise Jewish labor brigades humiliated the conscripted workers. After a Stawiski priest blamed the Jews for the murder of some German soldiers, the Germans executed several Jews, burned down the small synagogue or perhaps a bet midrash, and set fire to part of the town. The Germans deported a group of able-bodied male Jews (and Christians) to forced labor camps in East Prussia. After some three weeks, the Germans passed control of Stawiski to Soviet forces. (Note: Laura Crago and Elżbieta Rojowska (Encyclopedia of Camps and Ghettos, 1933–1945, 2012): "A Wehrmacht unit from the 21st Infantry Division briefly occupied Stawiski for about three weeks in September 1939. The soldiers raped Jewish women and plundered Jewish stores. Ordered to supervise Jewish labor brigades, some local Poles humiliated the conscripted workers. A Stawiski priest blamed the Jews for the murder of some soldiers. In retaliation, the Germans executed several Jews, burned the small synagogue, or perhaps a Bet Midrash, and set part of Stawiski on fire. The Germans deported a group of able-bodied Jewish and Christian men to forced labor camps in East Prussia before turning Stawiski over to the Soviets.")

Soviet rule lasted until the Germans returned to the town in June 1941 during Operation Barbarossa. Local Poles welcomed the arriving Germans with flowers, and German army scouts who arrived on 27 June noted the Poles' hatred for Jews. Local Poles, mostly recently released from Soviet prisons, asked German permission to take revenge on the Jews and killed some. In early July 1941 the Germans instigated a pogrom in which Polish mobs armed with iron bars murdered some 300 Jews. Some Poles were motivated by revenge against earlier Soviet supporters. A German Einsatzkommando was present in the town during 4–5 July 1941. A similar, better known, atrocity took place on 10 July 1941 in nearby Jedwabne.

Beginning on 17 August 1941, the Germans (Note: Postwar investigations placed responsibility on German gendarmes stationed in Kolno and Stawiski, but most Polish historians now think an SS unit from Płock (Schröttersburg), commanded by Obersturmführer Hermann Schaper, was responsible.) executed most of Stawiski's Jewish community. Some 900 able-bodied Jews were killed in a ditch near Mątwica, where Jewish women and children from Kolno and Jews from Mały Płock were also executed. Some 700 persons, mostly infants, elderly, and handicapped, were killed in Płaszczatka (or Stawiski) Forest. (Note: Laura Crago and Elżbieta Rojowska (Encyclopedia of Camps and Ghettos, 1933–1945, 2012): "Beginning on August 17, 1941, the Germans executed almost the entire Stawiski Jewish community. The able-bodied, about 900 people, perished in an antitank ditch outside Msciwuje village, the execution site also of the women and children of the Kolno community and the Jewish residents of Mały Płock. Another approximately 700 Stawiski victims, mostly infants, the elderly, and the handicapped, were executed in the Płaszczatka (or Stawiski) Forest.")

Some 60 to 105 Jews remained, mainly skilled workers and their families, who were confined to a ghetto. Some Jews from Stawiski who survived in hiding sought refuge in the Łomża Ghetto, others remained hidden until permitted by the Germans to work as farm laborers. (Note: Laura Crago and Elżbieta Rojowska (Encyclopedia of Camps and Ghettos, 1933–1945, 2012): "It consisted of a few homes on about 4,000 square meters (almost 1 acre) of land. Though surrounded by a fence, the ghetto was not guarded from either side. After surviving Jews from Grabowo and other nearby villages were consolidated there, the ghetto population stood at about 105 ... Jews who had survived the mass execution in hiding were not permitted to reside in the Stawiski ghetto ... Rather, they describe either seeking refuge in the ghetto in Łomża or hiding for many months, until the Germans permitted them to work as agricultural laborers for local Poles ...") On 2 November 1942 the ghetto was closed and its occupants were transferred to a transit camp in Bogusze, and from there were sent to the Auschwitz and Treblinka extermination camps. (Note: Laura Crago and Elżbieta Rojowska (Encyclopedia of Camps and Ghettos, 1933–1945, 2012) "On November 2, 1942, the Germans liquidated the Stawiski ghetto, driving its residents along with the Stawiski Jews who had lived outside the ghetto to a transit camp in Bogusze, a village located 4.8 kilometers (about 3 miles) north of Grajewo ... The Germans liquidated the transit camp in two deportations ... on December 15–16, 1942, and sent them from there to the Treblinka extermination camp ... on January 3, 1943, about 2,000 inmates were sent to the Auschwitz extermination camp.")

Some 50 Stawiski Jews managed to evade deportation, but most of them were found and executed in subsequent searches. Some of the hiding Jews were denounced by Poles, and at least 11 of them were murdered by local Poles in nearby Mały Płock gmina. (Note: Laura Crago and Elżbieta Rojowska (Encyclopedia of Camps and Ghettos, 1933–1945, 2012): "As many as 50 Stawiski Jews had evaded the Prostken deportation, but most were found in subsequent German searches ... in 1943, another Pole denounced their hiding places ... Another denunciation in August 1943 ... In 1944, at least another 11 Jews, including 6 members of the Rozensztejn family, reportedly were murdered by local Poles in the Mały Płock gmina.")

Only a few of the 2,000 pre-war Jewish inhabitants of Stawiski survived the Holocaust.

Some of the Stawiski Jews murdered during the war are buried in a mass grave at the Jewish cemetery in the Płaszczatka forest.

== Demographics ==
Historical population

Year	Pop.	±%
1871	3,524	—
1890	4,057	+15.1%
1897	3,339	−17.7%
1910	4,639	+38.9%
1921	3,017	−35.0%

Year	Pop.	±%
1931	2,912	−3.5%
1939	3,153	+8.3%
1950	1,369	−56.6%
1960	2,012	+47.0%
2010	2,350	+16.8%

== Economy ==
The main branch of local economy is agriculture, based on individual arable farms producing crops for local processing as well as raising farm animals for the market. Apart from farming, trade and service industries cover the needs of the inhabitants. The overall number of people employed in the gmina's economy is 3,545. The breakdown of main employment sectors is as follows. Farming and forestry: 2,304. Industry: 177. Trade and services: 727. Education, health services: 288. Administration and policing: 35.

The town's revenue in 2003 (including its surroundings) amounted 4.299 mln zloty. Net income was 900,000 zloty. However, expenses of the commune exceeded its profits in that period, and amounted to 4.679 mln zloty. Gross revenue and net profits fluctuate depending on expenditures in the public sector, such as environmental protection, water management, dump disposal, sewers, etc.

== Transport ==
The S61 expressway bypasses Stawiski to the west. Exit 9 of the expressway provides access to Ełk and Łomża.

The nearest railway station is in Łomża.

== Sport ==
A local football team, GKS Stawiski, was founded in 2008 and as of 2018 plays in the regional A-class league.

== Notable residents ==
Stawiski is the hometown of the famous chess player Akiba Rubinstein. In the main square, there is a monument to Stanisław Steczkowski Zagończyk, who, together with his four brothers, fought in the underground Polish Home Army in 1942–1945.
