= 5th Zaslaw Uhlan Regiment =

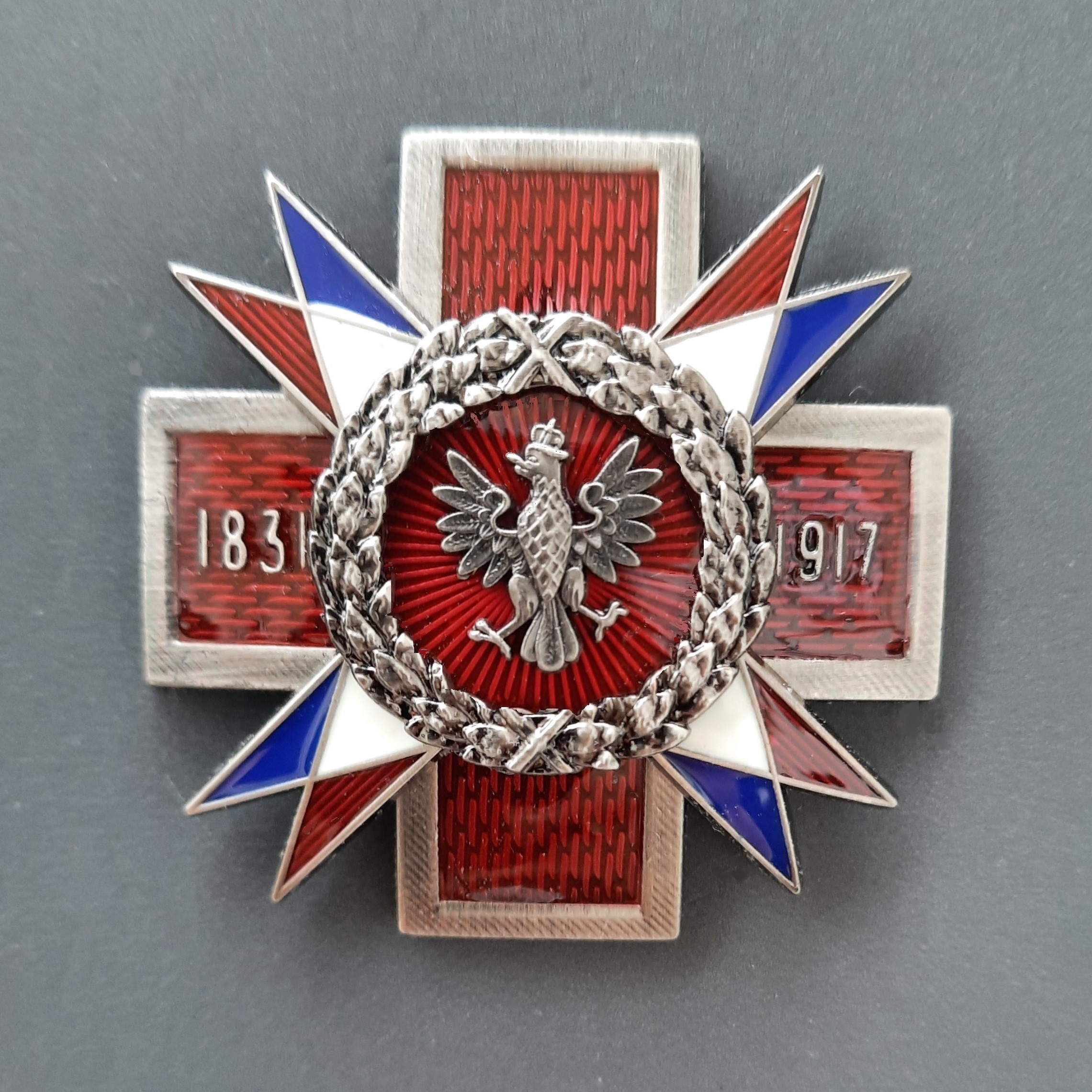
- Active: November 1917 – 12 May 1918; 13 November 1918 – 1939; 1944 – 1945
- Country: Poland
- Branch: Polish II Corps in Russia (November 1917-12 May 1918); Podlaska Cavalry Brigade (1937-1939); Home Army (1944-1945)
- Type: Uhlan
- Role: Cavalry
- Garrison/HQ: Ostrołęka
- Anniversaries: 26 September
- Engagements: World War I: Battle of Kaniów; Polish-Soviet War; World War II: Invasion of Poland; Operation Tempest

5th Zasław Uhlan Regiment (Polish: 5 Pułk Ułanów Zasławskich, 5 puł) was a cavalry unit of the Polish Army in the Second Polish Republic. It was garrisoned in the city of Ostrołęka, while its reserve was based in Garwolin. The regiment celebrated its day on September 26, the anniversary of the 1920 Charge of Zasław. Its traditions were based on the 5th Uhlan Regiment, created in 1830, which fought in the November Uprising.

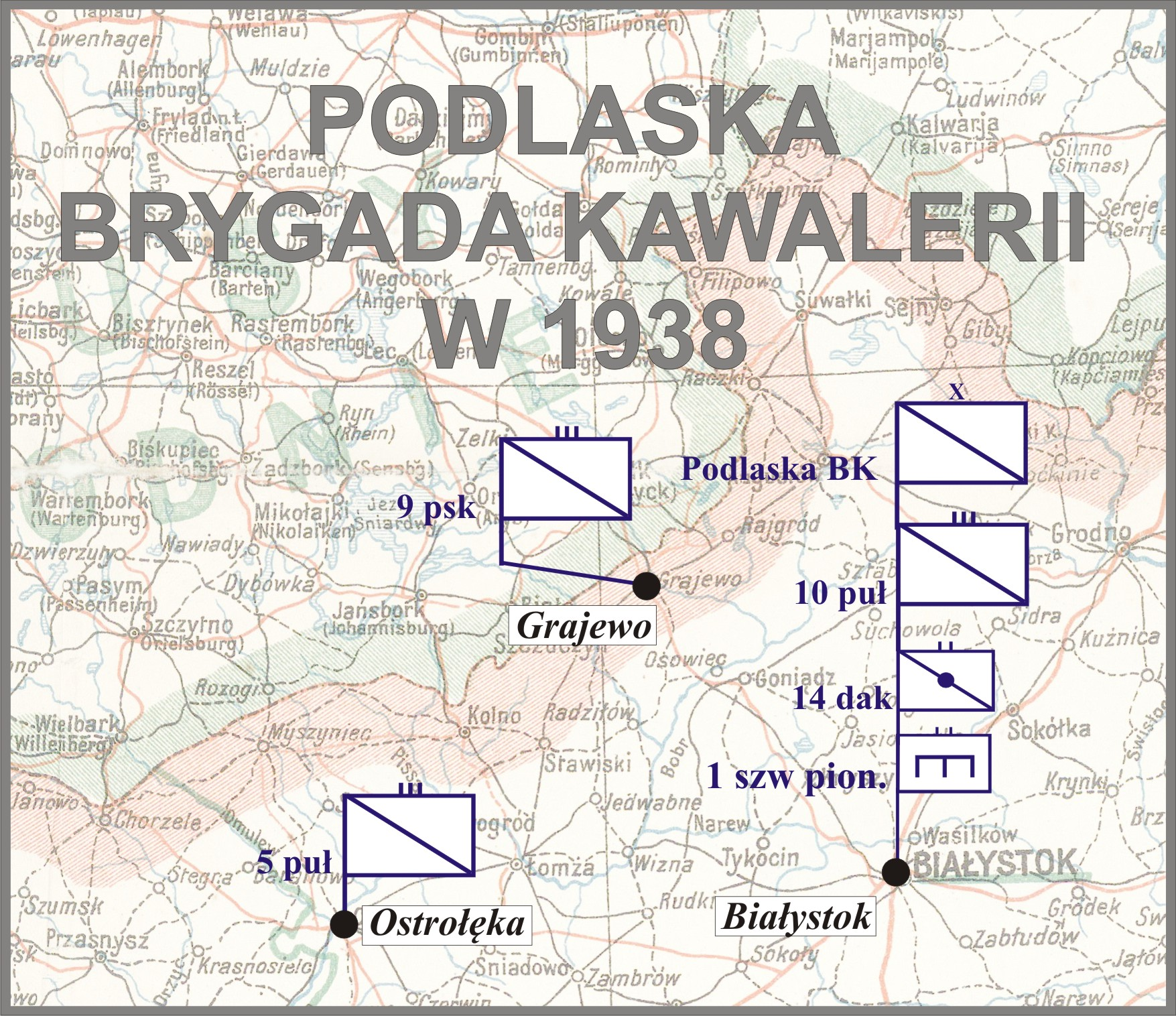
Podlaska BK w 1938

== History ==
The regiment dated back to November 1917, when Polish Cavalry Squadron was formed out of ethnic Poles, serving in Imperial Russian Army's 9th Cavalry Division. In January 1918, the squadron was reorganized into a regiment, which soon afterwards joined the Polish II Corps in Russia. On May 12, 1918, after the Battle of Kaniów, the regiment was dissolved by the Germans, who sent its officers to Brest Fortress.

On November 13, 1918, officers of the regiment were released from German prison, and arrived at Warsaw. On the next day, they began forming the 5th Uhlan Regiment, which was at first based in Mińsk Mazowiecki. The regiment fought in the Polish–Soviet War, after which it was garrisoned in Ostrołęka. During the 1939 Invasion of Poland, it belonged to Podlaska Cavalry Brigade.

In the summer 1944, the regiment was recreated by the Home Army, to fight in Operation Tempest.

== Commandants ==
- Colonel Stanislaw Sochaczewski (1917–1920)
- Colonel Spirydion Koiszewski (1920–15 I 1925)
- Colonel Anatol Jezierski (15 I 1925 – 1935)
- Colonel Stefan Chomicz (4 VII 1935–1939)
- Colonel Jerzy Anders (from 14 IX 1939)
- Major Aleksander Bednarczyk (1944–1945)

== Sources ==
- Kazimierz Satora: Opowieści wrześniowych sztandarów. Warszawa: Instytut Wydawniczy Pax, 1990. ISBN 83-211-1104-1.

== See also ==
- Polish cavalry
