= Tafiły =

- Village
- Location within Poland
- Coordinates: 53°24′N 22°11′E
- Country: Poland
- Voivodeship: Podlaskie
- County: Kolno
- Gmina: Stawiski
- Population: 62
- Time zone: UTC+1 (CET)
  - Summer (DST): UTC+2 (CEST)
- Vehicle registration: BKL

Tafiły [taˈfiwɨ] is a village in the administrative district of Gmina Stawiski, in Kolno County, Podlaskie Voivodeship, in north-eastern Poland.

Tafiły was the seat of the Tafiłowski noble family. In 1827 the village had a population of 26.

The Polish S61 highway runs near west of the village.
