= Jurzec Włościański =

- Village
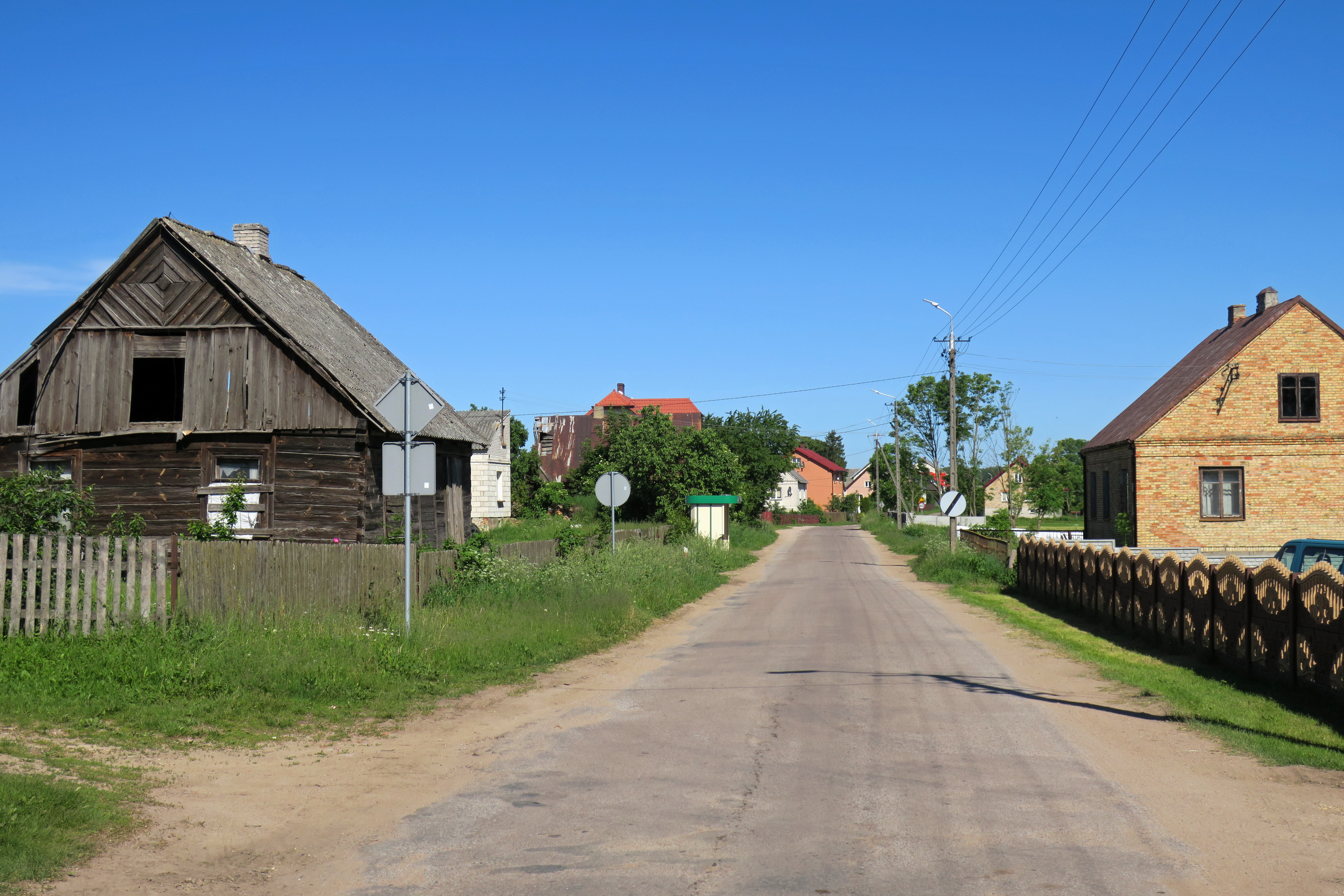

- Location within Poland
- Coordinates: 53°19′N 22°12′E
- Country: Poland
- Voivodeship: Podlaskie
- County: Kolno
- Gmina: Stawiski

Population
  - Total: 252
- Time zone: UTC+1 (CET)
  - Summer (DST): UTC+2 (CEST)

Jurzec Włościański (Polish pronunciation: [ˈjuʐɛts fwɔɕˈtɕaj̃skʲi]) is a village in the administrative district of Gmina Stawiski, within Kolno County, Podlaskie Voivodeship, in north-eastern Poland.

== History ==
Three Polish citizens were murdered by Nazi Germany in the village during World War II.
