= Podlaska Cavalry Brigade =

- Podlaska Brygada Kawalerii
- Active: 1937-1939
- Allegiance: Second Polish Republic
- Branch: Polish Armed Forces
- Type: Cavalry
- Part of: Independent Operational Group Narew
- Garrison/HQ: Białystok
- Engagements: World War II: Battle of Kock

The Podlaska Cavalry Brigade (Polish: Podlaska Brygada Kawalerii) was a military unit of the Polish Army, created on April 1, 1937. Its headquarters were in Białystok, and it was based on the Cavalry Brigade Białystok, existing between February 1929 and March 30, 1937.

== History ==
In February 1929, Polish Army created the "Białystok" Cavalry Brigade; which gathered such units as the 10th Regiment of Lithuanian Uhlans from Białystok, the 1st Krechowce Uhlan Regiment from Augustów, the 9th Regiment of Mounted Rifles from Grajewo, the 14th Brigade of Mounted Artillery from Białystok and a Squadron of Pioneers of the 1st Cavalry Division, also from Białystok.

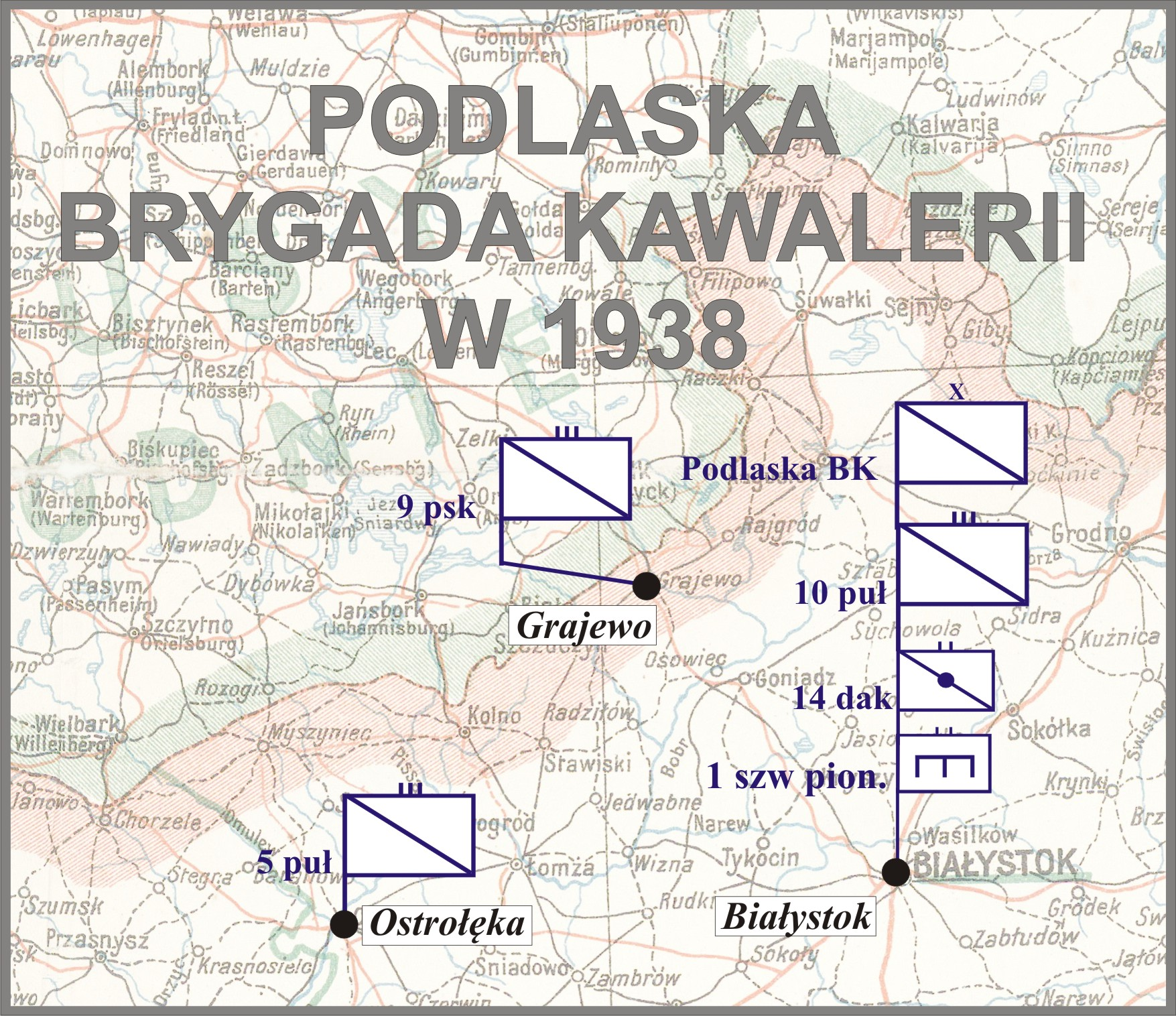
Podlaska BK w 1938

On April 1, 1937, Białystok Cavalry Brigade was renamed into Podlaska Cavalry Brigade (after the region of Podlasie), which resulted in some changes. A neighboring unit, Suwalska Cavalry Brigade, absorbed the 1st Krechowce Uhlan Regiment, while the 5th Regiment of Zaslaw Uhlans was transferred to Podlaska Cavalry Brigade. In the same year, the 10th Squadron of Communication was created.

== Structure (1937–1939) ==
- Headquarters in Białystok
- 5th Zaslaw Uhlan Regiment, from Ostrołęka
- 10th Lithuanian Uhlan Regiment, from Białystok
- 9th Mounted Rifles Regiment "Kazimierz Pulaski", from Grajewo
- 14th Horse Artillery Divizion, from Białystok
- 1st Pioneers Squadron, from Białystok
- 10th Communication Squadron, from Białystok

=== Armored component ===
- 32nd Armored Dyon - 13 TKS tankettes and 8 armored cars

== Polish September Campaign 1939 ==
Podlaska Cavalry Brigade, under General Ludwik Kmicic-Skrzynski, was part of Narew Independent Operational Group, commanded by General Czesław Młot-Fijałkowski. It did not engage in combat until September 3, covering the area of Łomża, and sporadically attacking Wehrmacht units advancing from East Prussia. In the night of September 3/4, the Brigade withdrew towards the lower Narew river. It was located near Ostrów Mazowiecka on September 8, where it attacked Panzer Division Kempf, under General Werner Kempf. In the evening of September 9, the Brigade engaged in heavy fighting, trying to recapture the town of Brok, with its bridge over the Bug River. The Poles managed to capture eastern part of the town, but then their advance was stopped.

On September 11, the Brigade withdrew towards Zambrów, next day it joined forces with Suwalska Cavalry Brigade, creating the so-called 'Group' of General Zygmunt Podhorski: "Zaza Cavalry 'Division'" ("Zaza" after "Zygmunt"). Depleted in continuous fighting, it headed eastwards to Białowieża, reaching the Białowieża Forest on September 16. After the Soviet invasion of Poland, remnants of the Brigade fought both Wehrmacht and Red Army troops, capitulating on October 6.

== See also ==
- Polish army order of battle in 1939
- Polish contribution to World War II
