= Rogale, Podlaskie Voivodeship =

Rogale
- Village
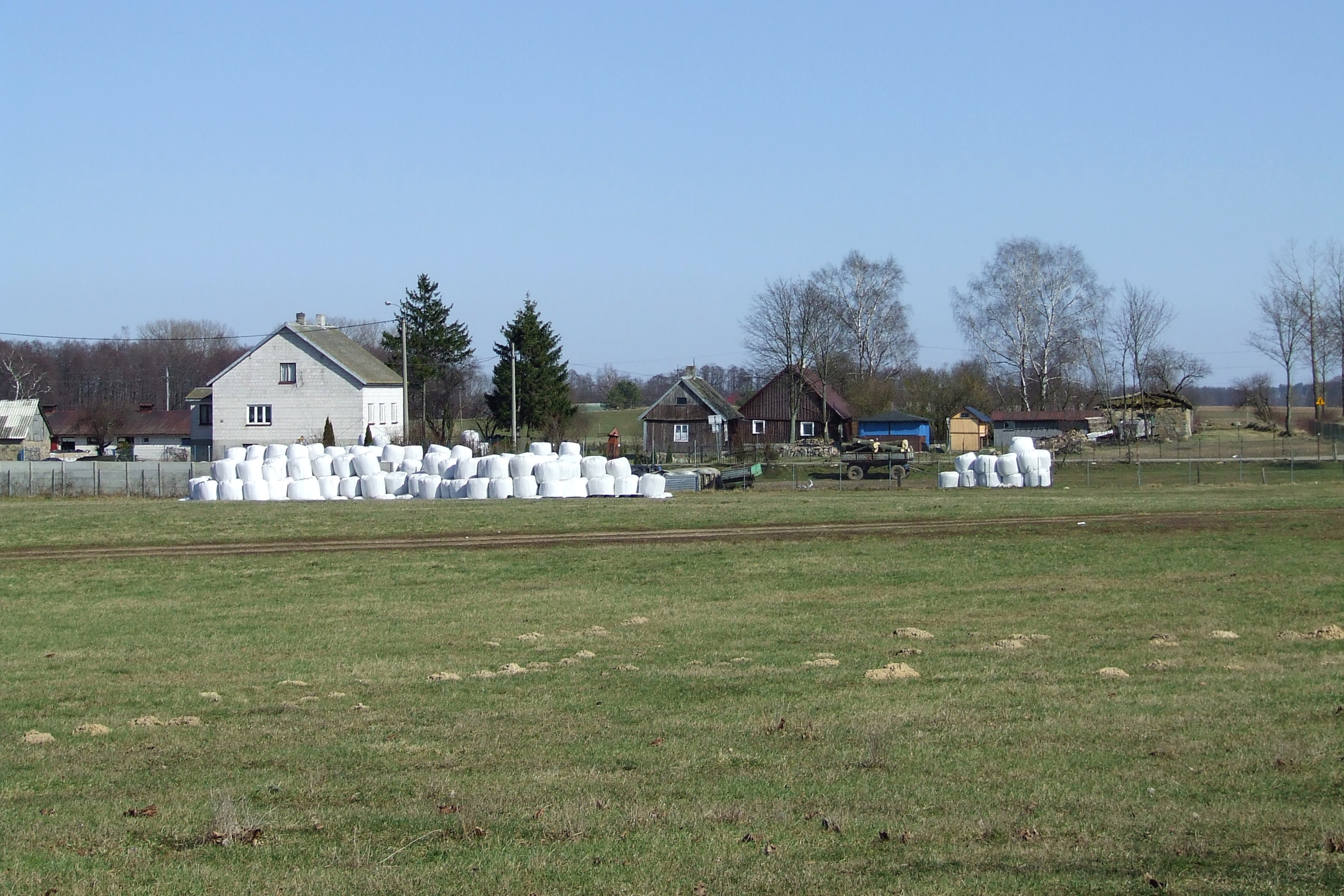

- Location within Poland
- Coordinates: 53°23′N 22°11′E
- Country: Poland
- Voivodeship: Podlaskie
- County: Kolno
- Gmina: Stawiski

Population
  - Total: 108
- Time zone: UTC+1 (CET)
  - Summer (DST): UTC+2 (CEST)
- Vehicle registration: BKL

Rogale ([rɔˈɡalɛ]) is a village in the administrative district of Gmina Stawiski, within Kolno County, Podlaskie Voivodeship, in north-eastern Poland.

The village was inhabited by petty nobility. As of 1827, it had a population of 106.
