= Romany, Podlaskie Voivodeship =

Romany
- Village
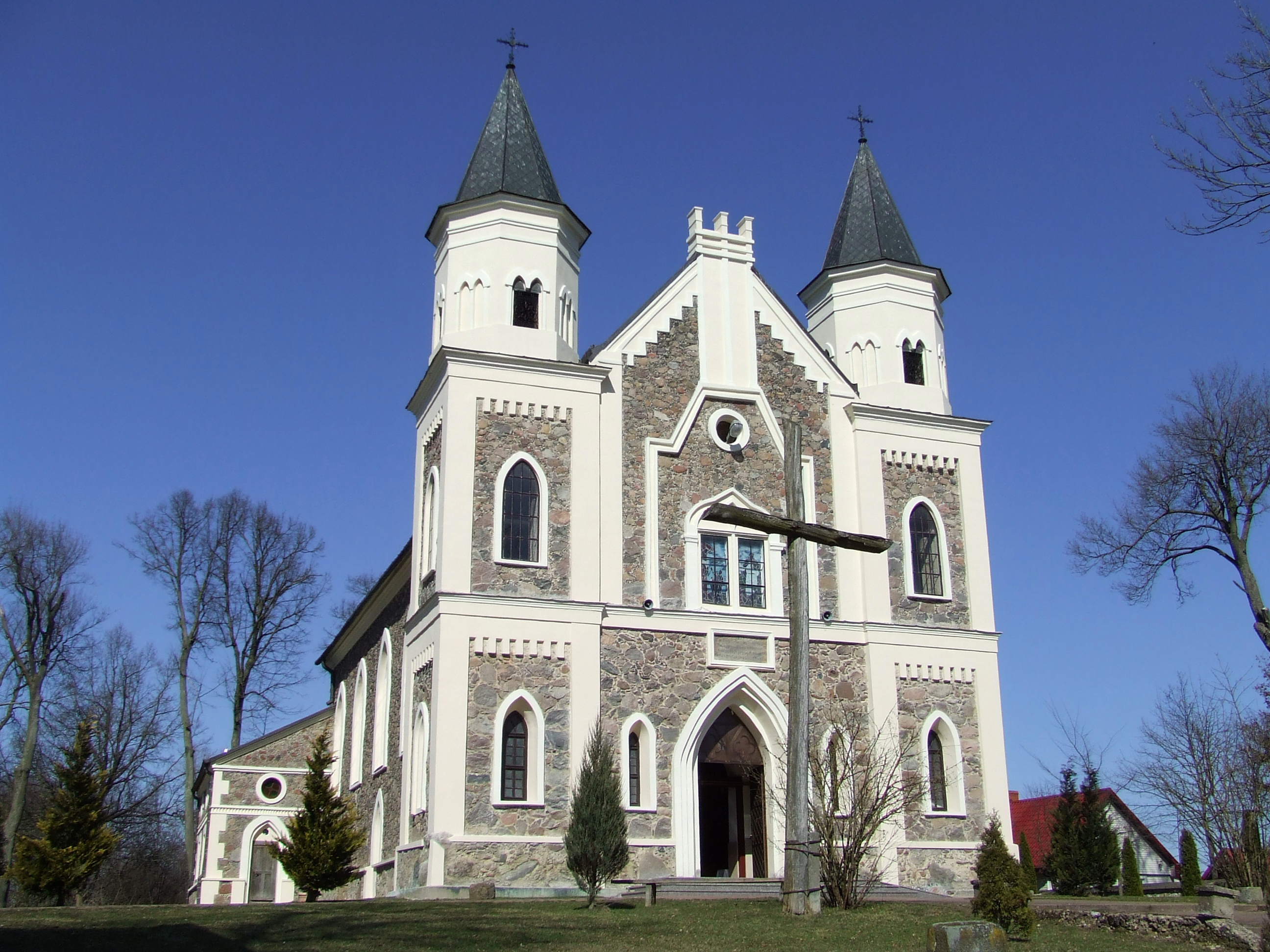
- Church of the Visitation in Romany

- Location within Poland
- Coordinates: 53°24′N 22°14′E
- Country: Poland
- Voivodeship: Podlaskie
- County: Kolno
- Gmina: Stawiski

Population
  - Total: 158
- Postal code: 18-520
- Vehicle registration: BKL

Romany [rɔˈmanɨ] is a village in the administrative district of Gmina Stawiski, within Kolno County, Podlaskie Voivodeship, in north-eastern Poland.

Five Polish citizens were murdered by Nazi Germany in the village during World War II.
