= Wysokie Duże =

- Village
- Location within Poland
- Coordinates: 53°17′N 22°6′E
- Country: Poland
- Voivodeship: Podlaskie
- County: Kolno
- Gmina: Stawiski

Population
  - Total: 64
- Postal code: 18-520
- Vehicle registration: BKL

Wysokie Duże [vɨˈsɔkʲɛ ˈduʐɛ] is a village in the administrative district of Gmina Stawiski, within Kolno County, Podlaskie Voivodeship, in north-eastern Poland.
