= Gmina Stawiski =

Gmina Stawiski Stawiski Commune
- Gmina
- Coat of arms

- Gmina Stawiski within the Kolno County
- Coordinates (Stawiski): 53°22′N 22°9′E
- Country: Poland
- Voivodeship: Podlaskie
- County: Kolno
- Seat: Stawiski

Area
  - Total: 165.55 km^{2} (63.92 sq mi)

Population (2011)
  - Total: 6,540
  - Density: 39.5/km^{2} (102/sq mi)
  - Urban: 2,441
  - Rural: 4,099
- Website: http://www.stawiski.pl

Gmina Stawiski is an urban-rural gmina (administrative district) in Kolno County, Podlaskie Voivodeship, in north-eastern Poland. Its seat is the town of Stawiski, which lies approximately 16 kilometres (10 mi) east of Kolno and 74 km (46 mi) west of the regional capital Białystok.

The gmina covers an area of 165.55 square kilometres (63.9 sq mi), and as of 2006 its total population is 6,572 (out of which the population of Stawiski amounts to 2,442, and the population of the rural part of the gmina is 4,130).

== Villages ==
Apart from the town of Stawiski, Gmina Stawiski contains the villages and settlements of Barzykowo, Budy Poryckie, Budy Stawiskie, Budziski, Cedry, Chmielewo, Cwaliny, Dąbrowa, Dzięgiele, Dzierzbia, Grabówek, Hipolitowo, Ignacewo, Jewilin, Jurzec Szlachecki, Jurzec Włościański, Karwowo, Kuczyny, Lisy, Łojewek, Michny, Mieczki-Sucholaszczki, Mieszołki, Poryte, Poryte Małe, Poryte Szlacheckie, Poryte Włościańskie, Ramoty, Rogale, Romany, Rostki, Skroda Mała, Sokoły, Tafiły, Wilczewo, Wysokie Duże, Wysokie Małe, Zabiele, Zaborowo, Zalesie and Żelazki.

== Neighbouring gminas ==
Gmina Stawiski is bordered by the gminas of Grabowo, Jedwabne, Kolno, Mały Płock, Piątnica and Przytuły.
