= Poryte =

- Village
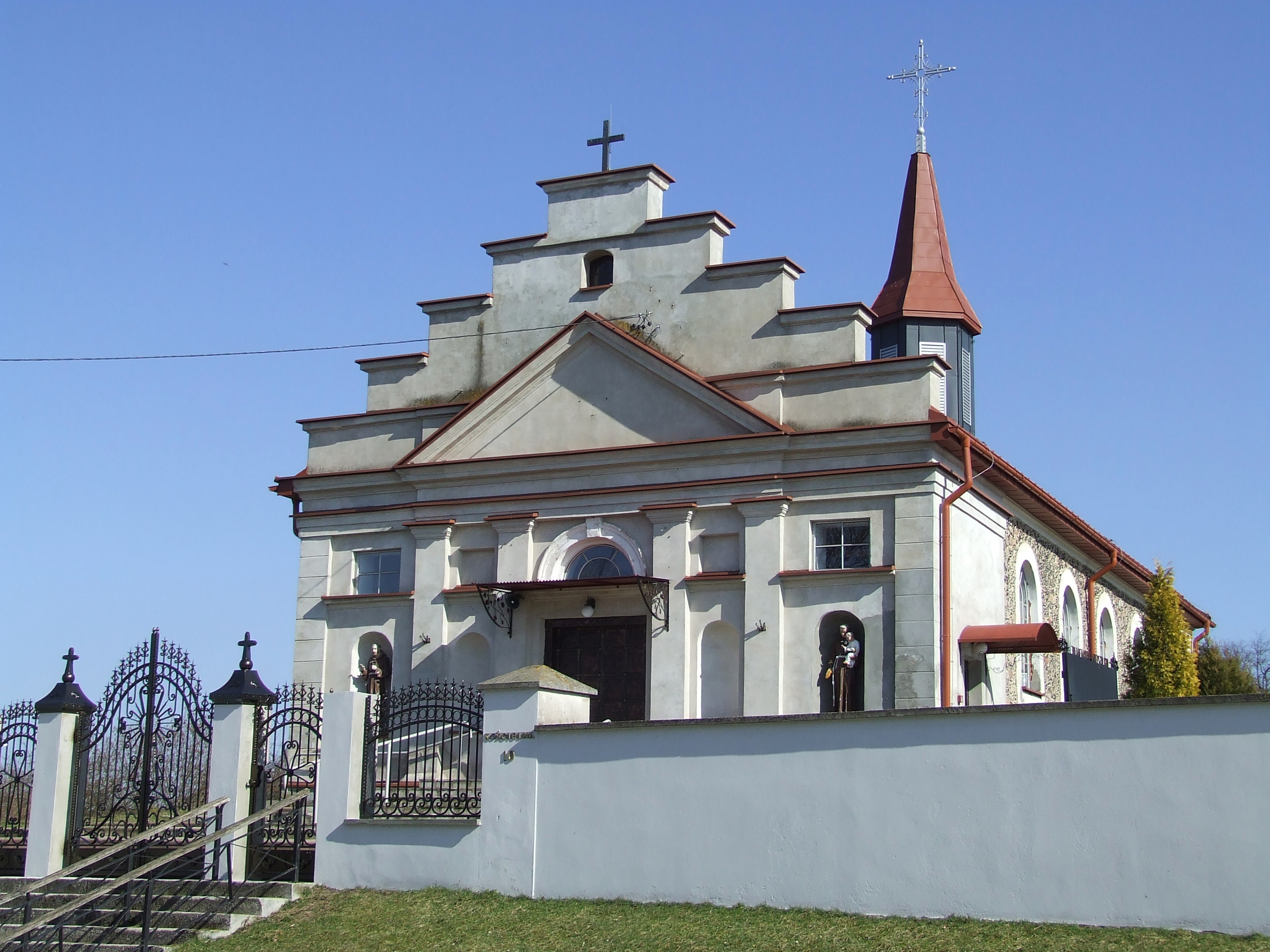
- Saint Adalbert church in Poryte

- Coat of arms

- Location within Poland
- Coordinates: 53°21′N 22°4′E
- Country: Poland
- Voivodeship: Podlaskie
- County: Kolno
- Gmina: Stawiski
- Population: 220
- Time zone: UTC+1 (CET)
  - Summer (DST): UTC+2 (CEST)
- Vehicle registration: BKL
- Website: http://poryte.4lomza.pl

Poryte [pɔˈrɨtɛ] is a village in the administrative district of Gmina Stawiski, within Kolno County, Podlaskie Voivodeship, in north-eastern Poland.

== History ==
Poryte was a private village of Polish nobility, including the Radzanowski and Niszycki families, administratively located in the Masovian Voivodeship in the Greater Poland Province of the Kingdom of Poland. The local Catholic church and parish was erected by nobleman Paweł Radzanowski in 1386. It was renewed by Adam Niszycki in 1639.

It was annexed by Prussia in the Third Partition of Poland in 1795. In 1807, it was regained by Poles and included within the short-lived Duchy of Warsaw. Following the duchy's dissolution in 1815, it fell to the Russian Partition of Poland. In 1827, Poryte had a population of 139. During the January Uprising, on February 24, 1864, it was the site of a battle between Polish insurgents and Russian troops. In 1884, the wedding of painter Wojciech Kossak and Maria née Kisielnicka, parents of painter Jerzy Kossak and poets Maria Pawlikowska-Jasnorzewska and Magdalena Samozwaniec, took place in Poryte. The village is also the resting place of several of their ancestors from the Kisielnicki family of Topór coat of arms. Following World War I, Poland regained independence and control of the village.

== Notable people ==
- Simona Kossak (1943–2007), Polish biologist, ecologist, and professor, buried at the local cemetery
