= Żelazki, Podlaskie Voivodeship =

Żelazki
- Village
- Location within Poland
- Coordinates: 53°21′N 22°13′E
- Country: Poland
- Voivodeship: Podlaskie
- County: Kolno
- Gmina: Stawiski
- Population: 36

Żelazki [ʐɛˈlaski] is a village in the administrative district of Gmina Stawiski, within Kolno County, Podlaskie Voivodeship, in north-eastern Poland.
