= Ołdaki =

Ołdaki may refer to the following places:

- Ołdaki, Ostrołęka County in Masovian Voivodeship (east-central Poland)
- Ołdaki, Pułtusk County in Masovian Voivodeship (east-central Poland)
- Ołdaki, Podlaskie Voivodeship (north-east Poland)
