= Jadeszki =

- Village
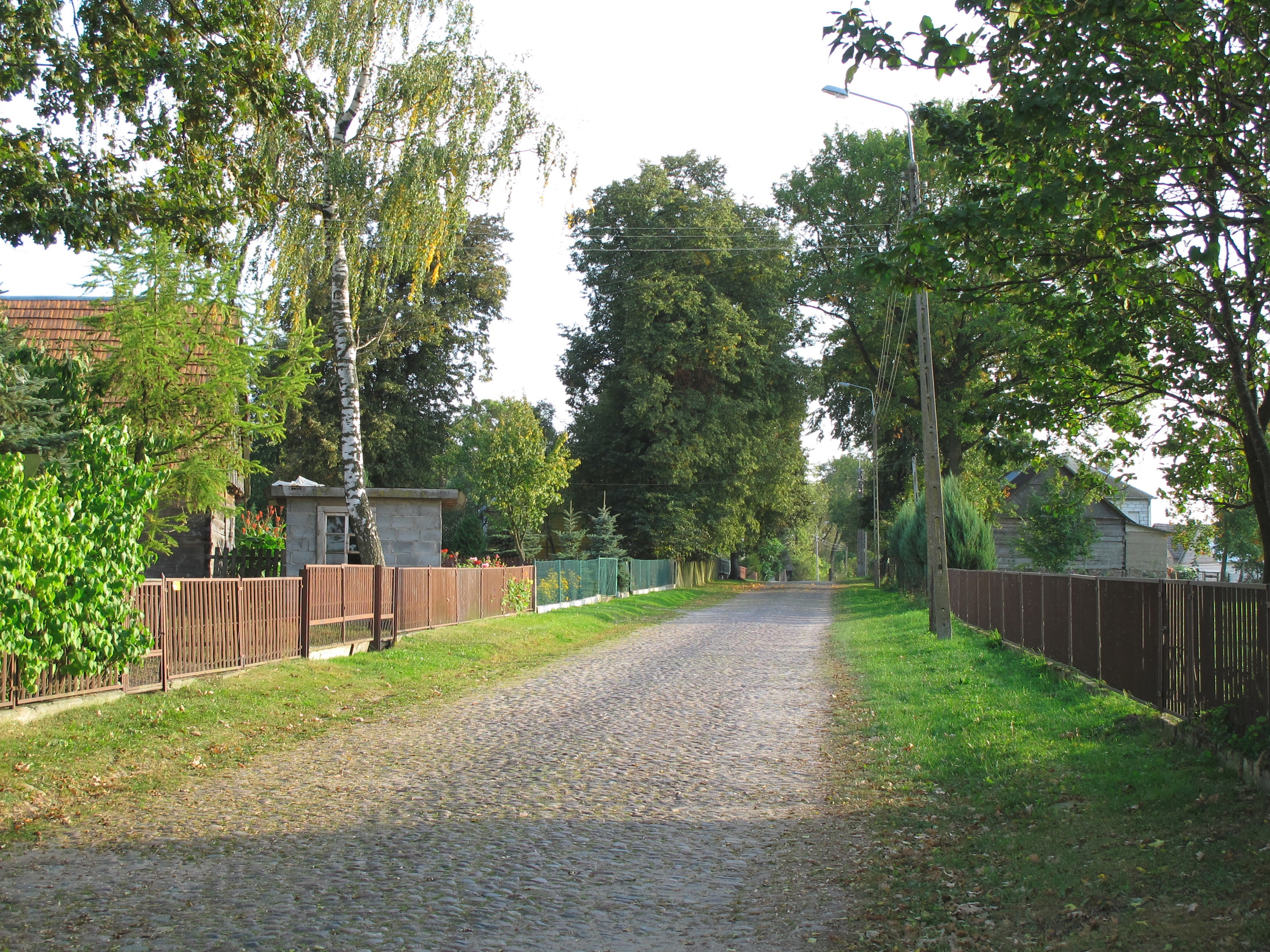
- Unpaved road in Jadeszki

- Location within Poland
- Coordinates: 53°26′10″N 22°55′40″E
- Country: Poland
- Voivodeship: Podlaskie
- County: Mońki
- Gmina: Jaświły

Jadeszki [jaˈdɛʂki] is a village in the administrative district of Gmina Jaświły, within Mońki County, Podlaskie Voivodeship, in north-eastern Poland.
