= Wodziłówka =

- Village
- Location within Poland
- Coordinates: 53°19′35″N 22°58′59″E
- Country: Poland
- Voivodeship: Podlaskie
- County: Mońki
- Gmina: Knyszyn

Wodziłówka [vɔd͡ʑiˈwufka] is a village in the administrative district of Gmina Knyszyn, within Mońki County, Podlaskie Voivodeship, in north-eastern Poland.
