= Szaciły =

Szaciły may refer to the following places:

- Szaciły, Białystok County in Podlaskie Voivodeship (north-east Poland)
- Szaciły, Mońki County in Podlaskie Voivodeship (north-east Poland)
- Szaciły, Sokółka County in Podlaskie Voivodeship (north-east Poland)
