= Dziękonie =

- Village
- Location within Poland
- Coordinates: 53°21′37″N 22°48′46″E
- Country: Poland
- Voivodeship: Podlaskie
- County: Mońki
- Gmina: Mońki
- Population: 120

Dziękonie (Polish pronunciation: [d͡ʑɛnˈkɔɲɛ]) is a village in the administrative district of Gmina Mońki, within Mońki County, Podlaskie Voivodeship, in north-eastern Poland.
