= Górnystok =

- Village
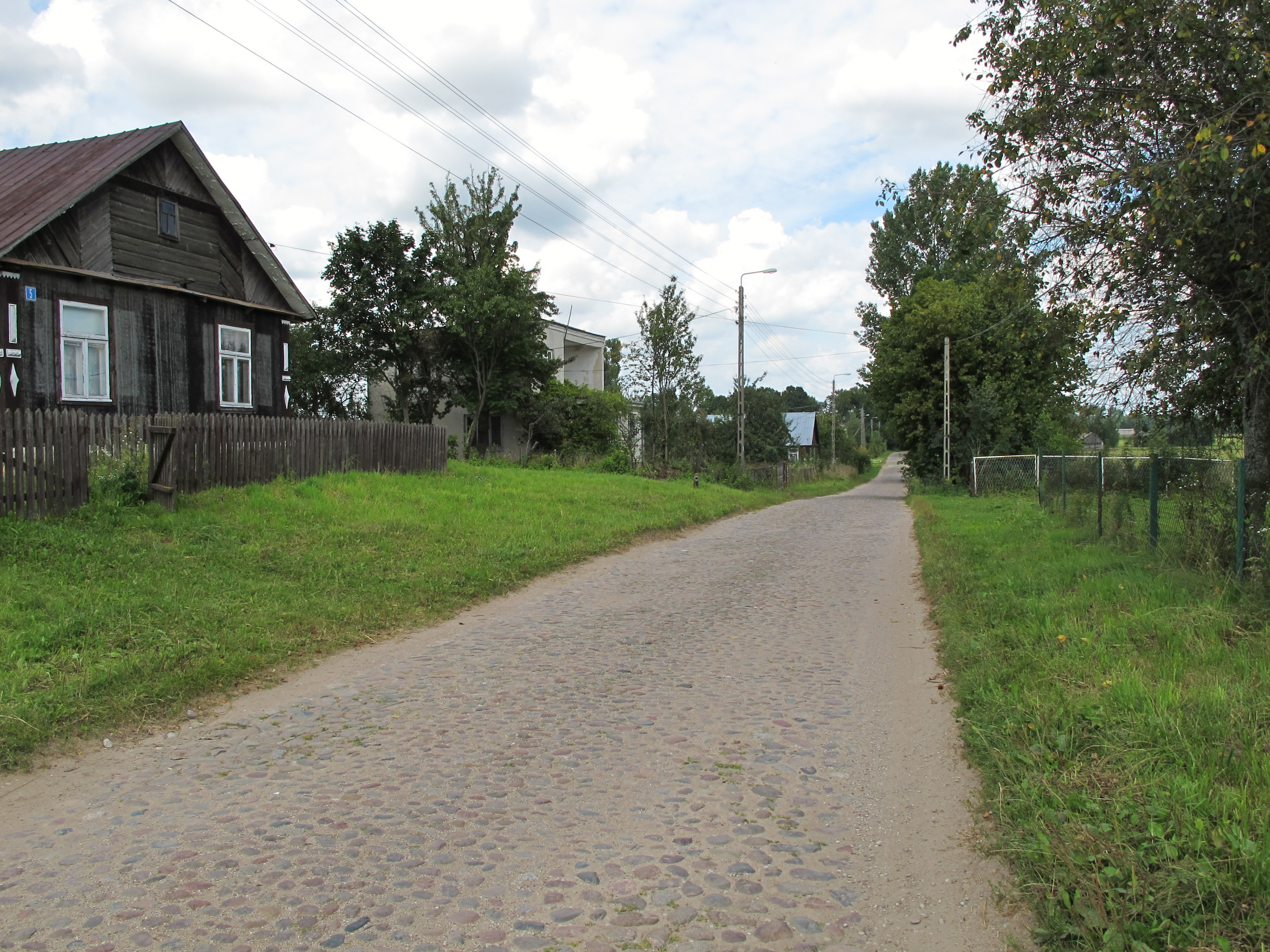
- Road sign in Górnystok

- Location within Poland
- Coordinates: 53°21′N 23°04′E
- Country: Poland
- Voivodeship: Podlaskie
- County: Mońki
- Gmina: Jasionówka

Górnystok [ɡurˈnɨstɔk] is a village in the administrative district of Gmina Jasionówka, within Mońki County, Podlaskie Voivodeship, in north-eastern Poland.
