= Kulesze-Chobotki =

- Village
- Location within Poland
- Coordinates: 53°15′06″N 22°47′00″E
- Country: Poland
- Voivodeship: Podlaskie
- County: Mońki
- Gmina: Krypno

Kulesze-Chobotki [kuˈlɛʂɛ xɔˈbɔtki] is a village in the administrative district of Gmina Krypno, within Mońki County, Podlaskie Voivodeship, in north-eastern Poland.
