= Moniuszeczki =

- Village
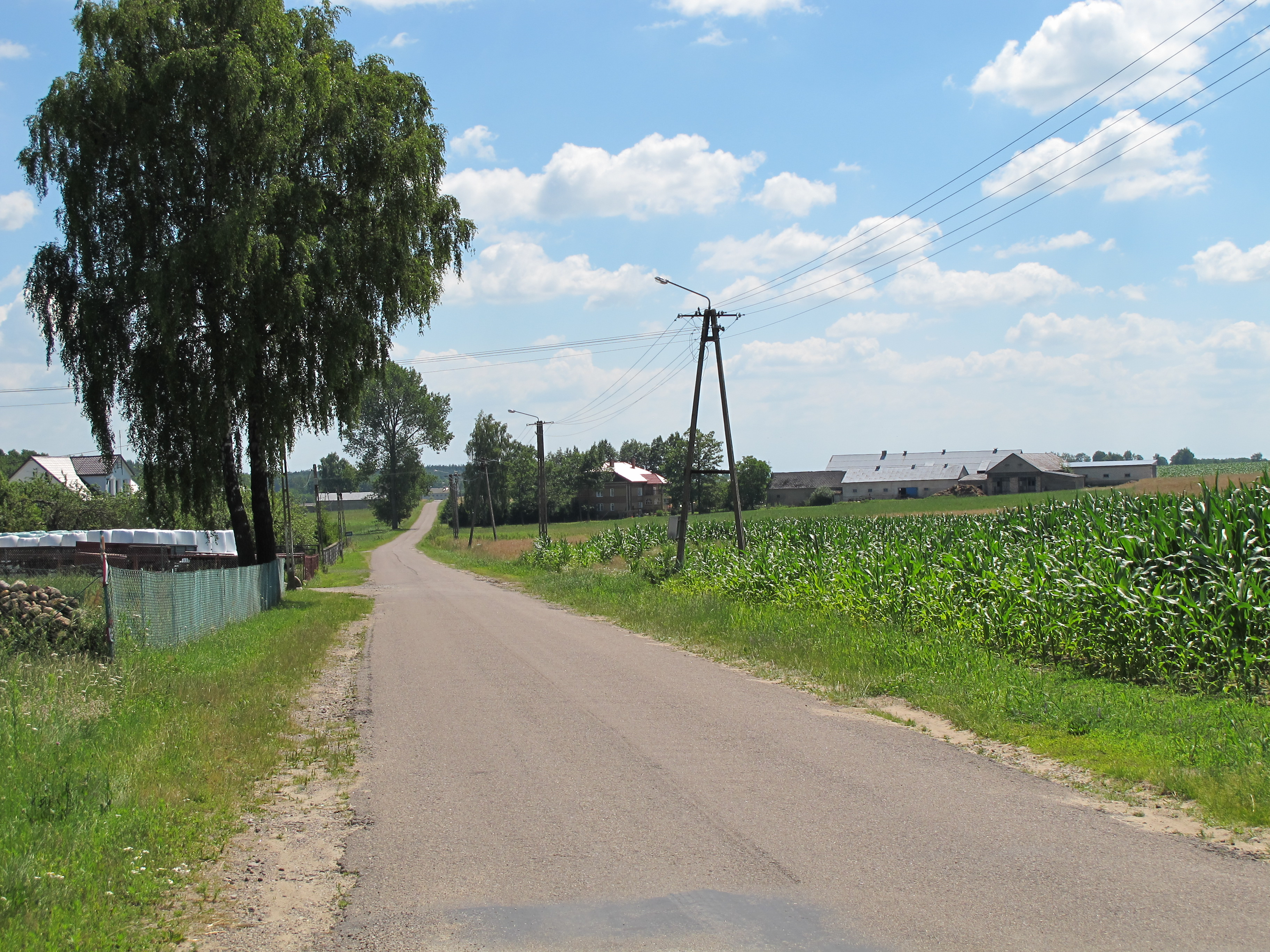
- Street of Moniuszeczki

- Location within Poland
- Coordinates: 53°23′02″N 22°47′32″E
- Country: Poland
- Voivodeship: Podlaskie
- County: Mońki
- Gmina: Mońki

Moniuszeczki [mɔɲuˈʂɛt͡ʂki] is a village in the administrative district of Gmina Mońki, within Mońki County, Podlaskie Voivodeship, in north-eastern Poland.
