= Guzy, Podlaskie Voivodeship =

Guzy
- Village
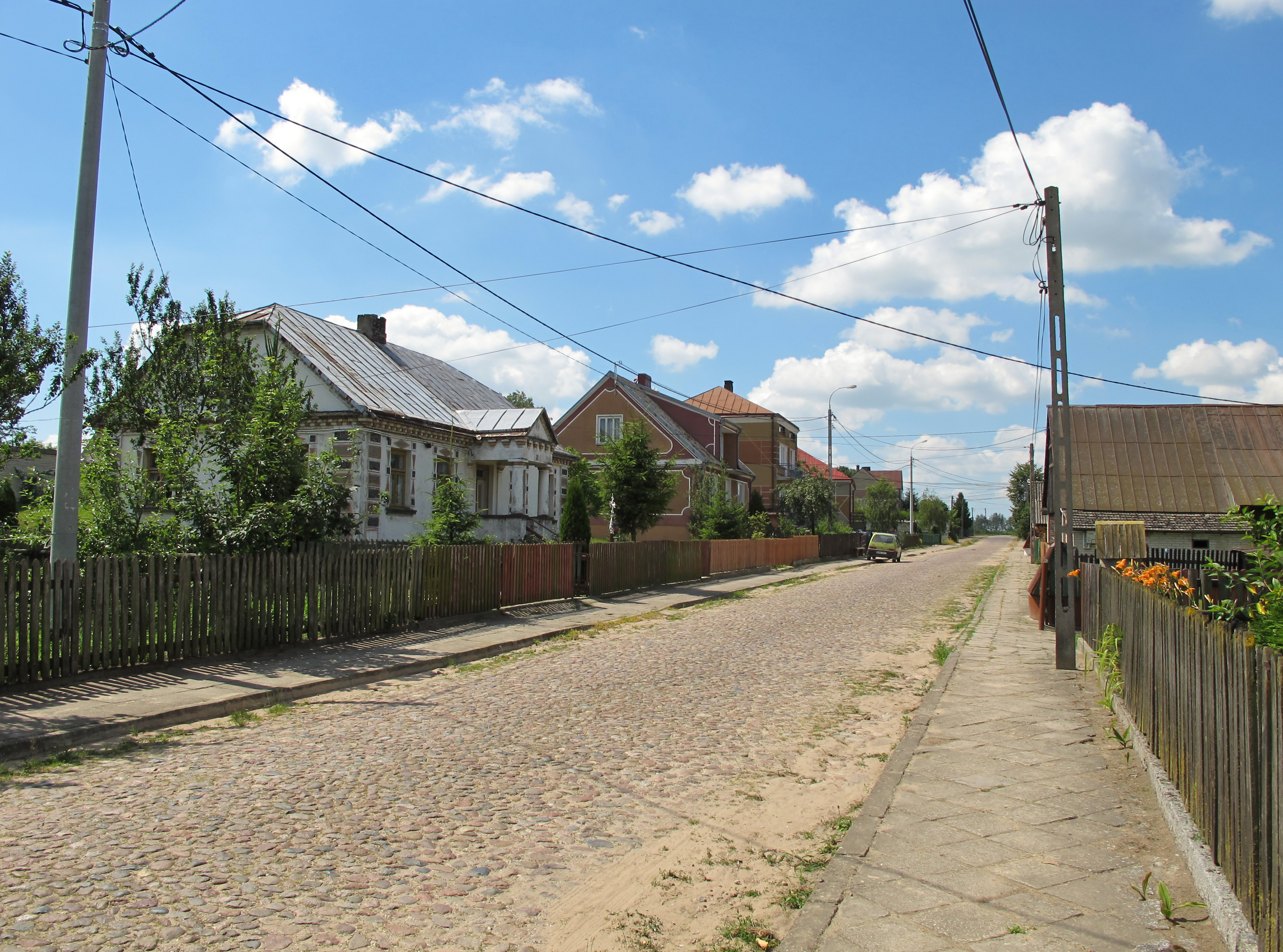
- Houses in Guzy, Podlaskie Voivodeship

- Location within Poland
- Coordinates: 53°22′4.5″N 22°54′52.89″E
- Country: Poland
- Voivodeship: Podlaskie
- County: Mońki
- Gmina: Knyszyn

Guzy [ˈɡuzɨ] is a village in the administrative district of Gmina Knyszyn, within Mońki County, Podlaskie Voivodeship, in north-eastern Poland.
