= Kalinówka Kościelna =

- Village
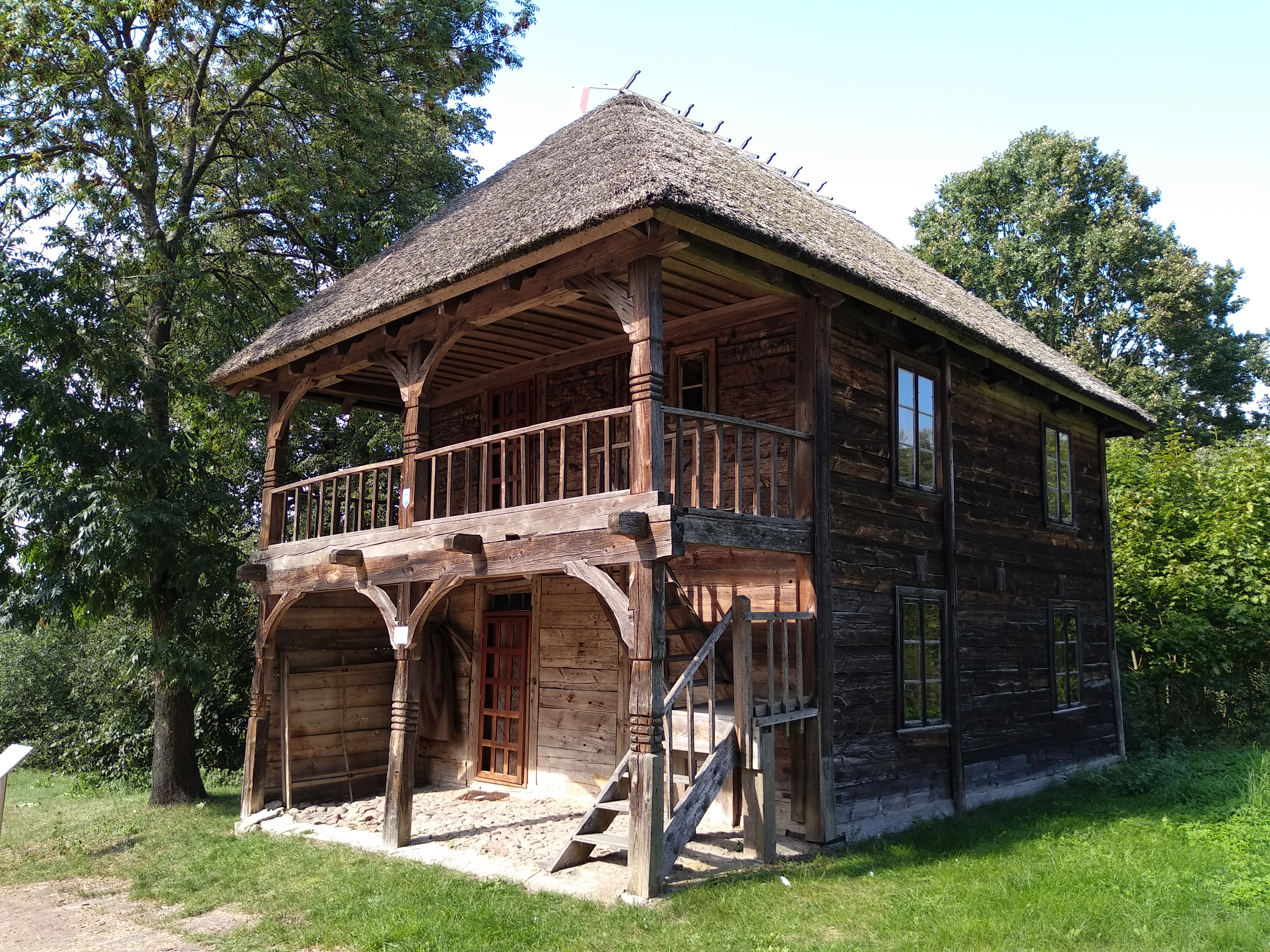

- Location within Poland
- Coordinates: 53°23′13″N 22°55′43″E
- Country: Poland
- Voivodeship: Podlaskie
- County: Mońki
- Gmina: Knyszyn
- Population: 205

Kalinówka Kościelna [kaliˈnufka kɔɕˈt͡ɕɛlna] is a village in the administrative district of Gmina Knyszyn, within Mońki County, Podlaskie Voivodeship, in north-eastern Poland.

Until 1954, the village was the seat of the Kalinówka gmina. In 1954–1972, the village belonged to and was the seat of the Kalinówka Kościelna gromada.
