= Krasne Folwarczne =

- Village
- Location within Poland
- Coordinates: 53°20′N 23°5′E
- Country: Poland
- Voivodeship: Podlaskie
- County: Mońki
- Gmina: Jasionówka

Krasne Folwarczne [ˈkrasnɛ fɔlˈvart͡ʂnɛ] is a village in the administrative district of Gmina Jasionówka, within Mońki County, Podlaskie Voivodeship, in north-eastern Poland.
