= Czekołdy =

- Village
- Location within Poland
- Coordinates: 53°22′N 22°47′E
- Country: Poland
- Voivodeship: Podlaskie
- County: Mońki
- Gmina: Mońki

Czekołdy [t͡ʂɛˈkɔu̯dɨ] is a village in the administrative district of Gmina Mońki, within Mońki County, Podlaskie Voivodeship, in northeastern Poland.
