= Nowiny Kasjerskie =

- Village
- Location within Poland
- Coordinates: 53°19′42″N 23°01′48″E
- Country: Poland
- Voivodeship: Podlaskie
- County: Mońki
- Gmina: Knyszyn

Nowiny Kasjerskie [nɔˈvinɨ kasˈjɛrskʲɛ] is a village in the administrative district of Gmina Knyszyn, within Mońki County, Podlaskie Voivodeship, in north-eastern Poland.
