= Starowola, Podlaskie Voivodeship =

Starowola
- Village
- Location within Poland
- Coordinates: 53°26′11″N 22°55′41″E
- Country: Poland
- Voivodeship: Podlaskie
- County: Mońki
- Gmina: Jaświły

Starowola [starɔˈvɔla] is a village in the administrative district of Gmina Jaświły, within Mońki County, Podlaskie Voivodeship, in north-eastern Poland.

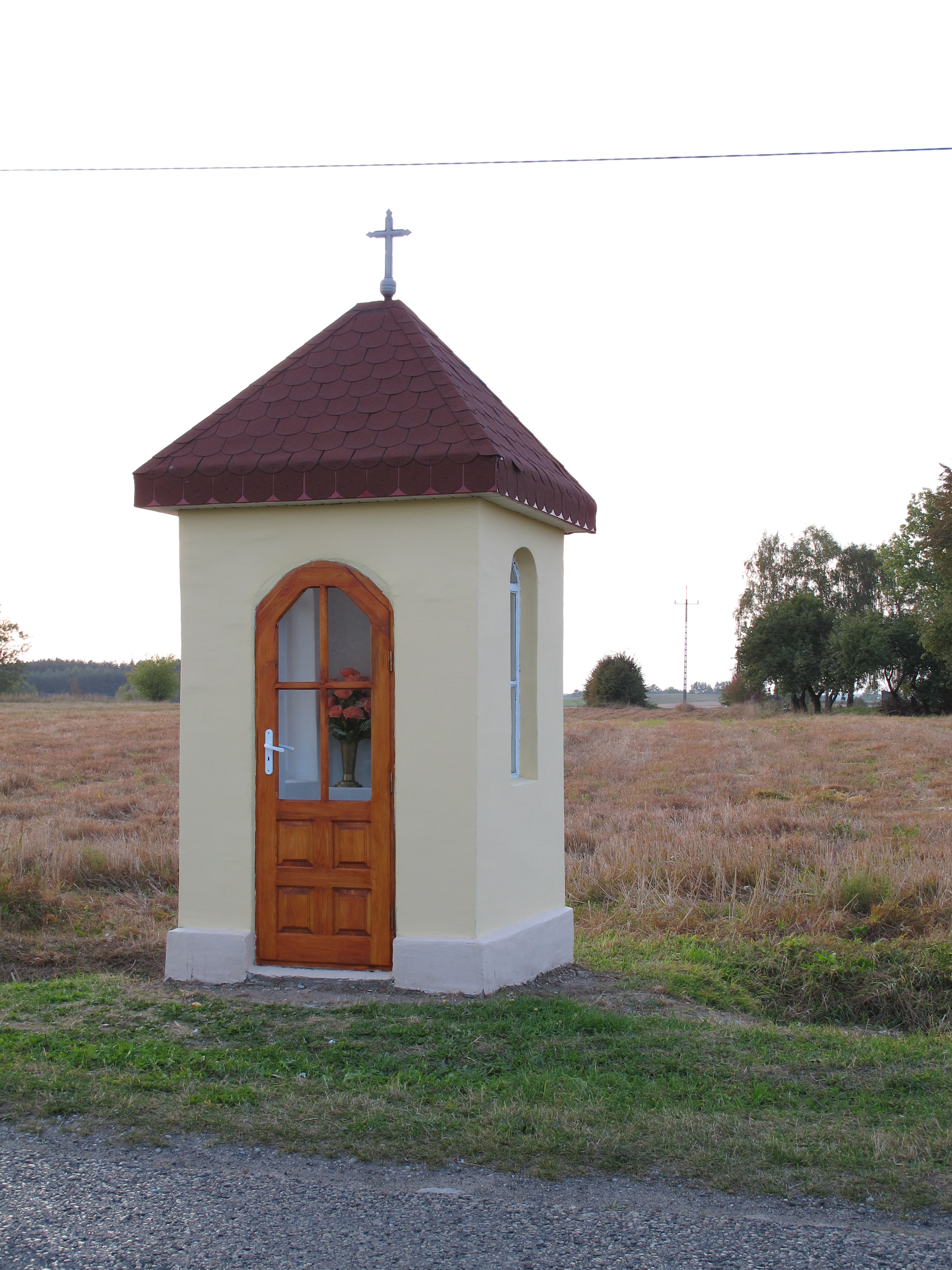
Podlaskie - Jaświły - Starowola - Kapliczka 20110925 01

According to the 1921 census, the village was inhabited by 28 people, among whom 22 were Roman Catholic, 5 Orthodox, and 1 Mosaic. At the same time, 22 inhabitants declared Polish nationality, 5 Belarusian and 1 Jewish. There were 4 residential buildings in the village.
