= Jaski, Podlaskie Voivodeship =

Jaski
- Village
- Location within Poland
- Coordinates: 53°26′25″N 22°46′34″E
- Country: Poland
- Voivodeship: Podlaskie
- County: Mońki
- Gmina: Mońki

Jaski [ˈjaski] is a village in the administrative district of Gmina Mońki, within Mońki County, Podlaskie Voivodeship, in north-eastern Poland.
