= Łękobudy =

- Village
- Location within Poland
- Coordinates: 53°21′N 23°3′E
- Country: Poland
- Voivodeship: Podlaskie
- County: Mońki
- Gmina: Jasionówka

Łękobudy [wɛnkɔˈbudɨ] is a village in the administrative district of Gmina Jasionówka, within Mońki County, Podlaskie Voivodeship, in north-eastern Poland.
