= Hornostaje-Osada =

- Village
- Location within Poland
- Coordinates: 53°25′10″N 22°47′45″E
- Country: Poland
- Voivodeship: Podlaskie
- County: Mońki
- Gmina: Mońki
- Population: 210

Hornostaje-Osada [xɔrnɔsˈtajɛ ɔˈsada] is a village in the administrative district of Gmina Mońki, within Mońki County, Podlaskie Voivodeship, in north-eastern Poland.
