= Brzozowa, Mońki County =

Brzozowa
- Village
- Location within Poland
- Coordinates: 53°30′13″N 23°2′43″E
- Country: Poland
- Voivodeship: Podlaskie
- County: Mońki
- Gmina: Jaświły

Brzozowa [bʐɔˈzɔva] is a village in the administrative district of Gmina Jaświły, within Mońki County, Podlaskie Voivodeship, in north-eastern Poland.
