= Kuczyn, Mońki County =

Kuczyn
- Village
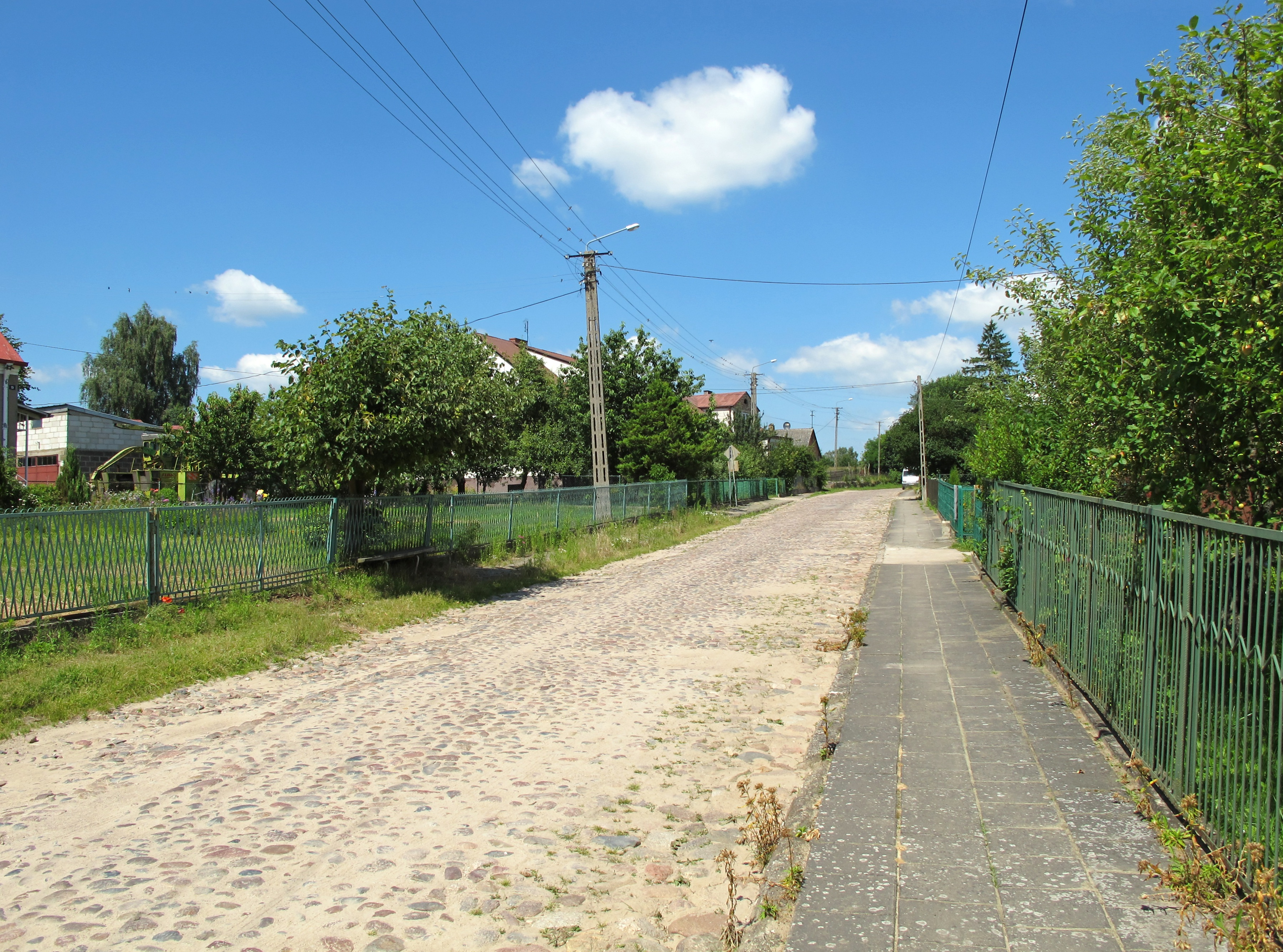

- Location within Poland
- Coordinates: 53°23′N 22°48′E
- Country: Poland
- Voivodeship: Podlaskie
- County: Mońki
- Gmina: Mońki

Kuczyn [ˈkut͡ʂɨn] is a village in the administrative district of Gmina Mońki, within Mońki County, Podlaskie Voivodeship, in north-eastern Poland.
