= Rekle, Podlaskie Voivodeship =

Rekle
- Village
- Location within Poland
- Coordinates: 53°17′N 22°47′E
- Country: Poland
- Voivodeship: Podlaskie
- County: Mońki
- Gmina: Krypno

Rekle [ˈrɛklɛ] is a village in the administrative district of Gmina Krypno, within Mońki County, Podlaskie Voivodeship, in north-eastern Poland.
