= Dudki, Podlaskie Voivodeship =

Dudki
- Village
- Location within Poland
- Coordinates: 53°22′42″N 22°53′43″E
- Country: Poland
- Voivodeship: Podlaskie
- County: Mońki
- Gmina: Mońki
- Population: 120

Dudki [ˈdutki] is a village in the administrative district of Gmina Mońki, within Mońki County, Podlaskie Voivodeship, in north-eastern Poland.
