= Krypno Wielkie =

- Village
- Location within Poland
- Coordinates: 53°16′N 22°52′E
- Country: Poland
- Voivodeship: Podlaskie
- County: Mońki
- Gmina: Krypno
- Population: 620

Krypno Wielkie [ˈkrɨpnɔ ˈvjɛlkʲɛ] is a village in the administrative district of Gmina Krypno, within Mońki County, Podlaskie Voivodeship, in north-eastern Poland.
