= Knyszyn-Cisówka =

- Settlement
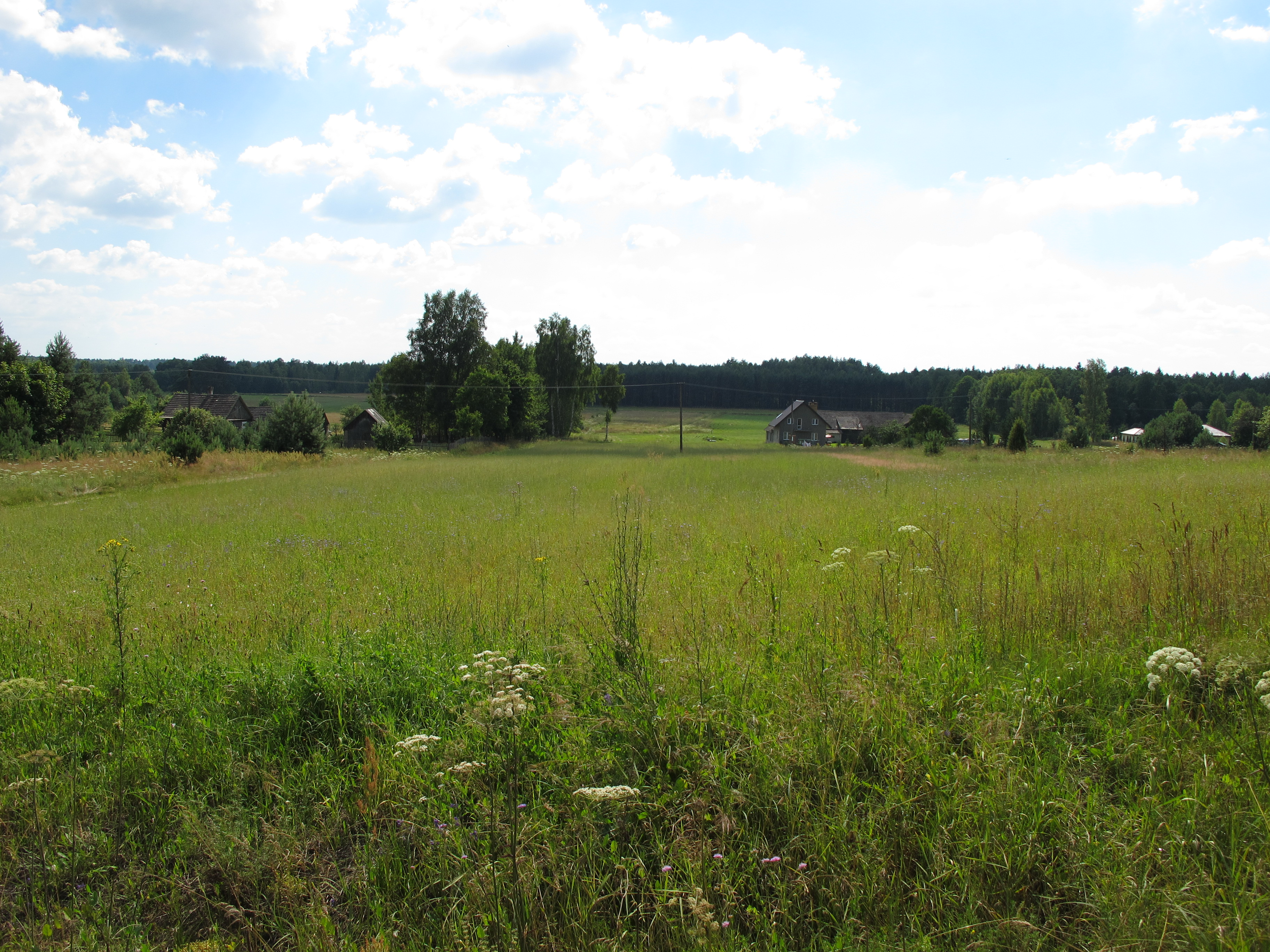

- Location within Poland
- Coordinates: 53°17′9″N 22°58′13″E
- Country: Poland
- Voivodeship: Podlaskie
- County: Mońki
- Gmina: Knyszyn
- Population: 20

Knyszyn-Cisówka [ˈknɨʂɨn t͡ɕiˈsufka] is a settlement in the administrative district of Gmina Knyszyn, within Mońki County, Podlaskie Voivodeship, in north-eastern Poland.
