= Peńskie =

- Village
- Location within Poland
- Coordinates: 53°19′N 22°49′E
- Country: Poland
- Voivodeship: Podlaskie
- County: Mońki
- Gmina: Krypno

Peńskie [ˈpɛɲskʲɛ] is a village in the administrative district of Gmina Krypno, within Mońki County, Podlaskie Voivodeship, in north-eastern Poland.

According to the 1921 census, the village was inhabited by 476 people, among whom 467 were Roman Catholic, 2 Orthodox, and 7 Mosaic. At the same time, all inhabitants declared Polish nationality. There were 69 residential buildings in the village.
