= Masie =

- Village
- Location within Poland
- Coordinates: 53°24′N 22°44′E
- Country: Poland
- Voivodeship: Podlaskie
- County: Mońki
- Gmina: Mońki

Masie [ˈmaɕɛ] is a village in the administrative district of Gmina Mońki, within Mońki County, Podlaskie Voivodeship, in north-eastern Poland.
