= Stoczek, Mońki County =

Stoczek
- Settlement
- Location within Poland
- Coordinates: 53°22′03″N 22°59′03″E
- Country: Poland
- Voivodeship: Podlaskie
- County: Mońki
- Gmina: Knyszyn

Stoczek [ˈstɔt͡ʂɛk] is a settlement in the administrative district of Gmina Knyszyn, within Mońki County, Podlaskie Voivodeship, in north-eastern Poland.
