= Czechowizna =

- Village
- Location within Poland
- Coordinates: 53°20′N 22°53′E
- Country: Poland
- Voivodeship: Podlaskie
- County: Mońki
- Gmina: Knyszyn
- Population (approx.): 200

Czechowizna [t͡ʂɛxɔˈvizna] is a village in the administrative district of Gmina Knyszyn, within Mońki County, Podlaskie Voivodeship, in north-eastern Poland.
