= Wojtówce =

- Village
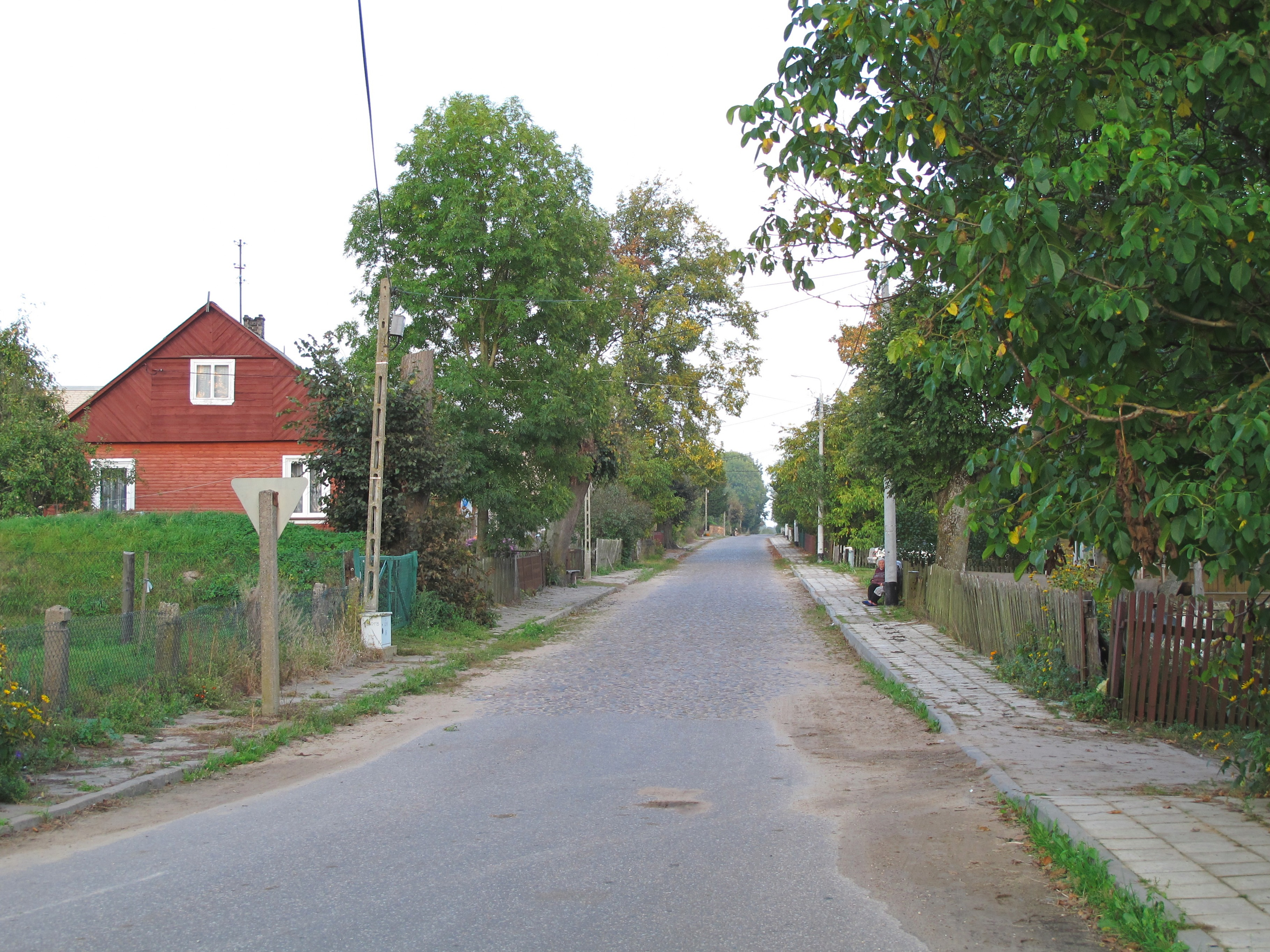
- Road in Wojtówce

- Location within Poland
- Coordinates: 53°23′23″N 22°56′32″E
- Country: Poland
- Voivodeship: Podlaskie
- County: Mońki
- Gmina: Knyszyn

Wojtówce [vɔi̯ˈtuft͡sɛ] is a village in the administrative district of Gmina Knyszyn, within Mońki County, Podlaskie Voivodeship, in north-eastern Poland.
