= Piotr Semenenko =

Polish Catholic priest and philosopher (1814-1886)

Servant of God Piotr Semenenko CR
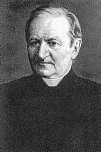

Personal life
- Born: June 29, 1814 Dzięciołowo
- Died: November 18, 1886 (aged 72) Paris, France

Religious life
- Religion: Catholic
- Church: Roman Catholic Church

Piotr Semenenko, CR (June 29, 1814 – November 18, 1886) was a Polish Catholic priest who cofounded the Resurrectionists and served as superior general. As a philosopher and theologian, he was regarded as one of the most scholarly Polish Catholics in the second half of the 19th century. He was the author of many philosophical and theological works, as well as on the interior life. He left a massive correspondence, as well as a personal diary.

== Biography ==
Peter Semenenko was born into a Ruthenian family on June 29, 1814, in Dzięciołowo in north-east Poland. In 1830, he started his studies at the University of Wilno in the Department of Philosophy, but soon interrupted them because he decided to join the November Uprising against Russian invaders. He emigrated to France in 1832. While in Paris, he met Bogdan Jański in 1833, who soon became his spiritual director and master. Under his influence, Semenenko returned to the Catholic faith and became the first member of the "Jański House" in 1836, which was the beginning of the Congregation of the Resurrection.

After the early death of Jański in 1840 in Rome, Semenenko was elected the first superior and spiritual leader of the new community. When he finished his theological studies at the Collegium Romanum (1837–41), he was ordained to the priesthood on December 5, 1841.

== Congregation of the Resurrection of Our Lord Jesus Christ ==
As a co-founder of the order, he wrote the rule of 1842 and was the principal editor of the (1850 - 1880) rule. He became superior general of the Congregation from 1842-1845 and 1873-1886.

== Polish Pontifical College in Rome ==
In 1865, he founded and was the first rector of the Polish Pontifical College in Rome. Between 1865-1938, many alumni of the college accepted and adopted Resurrectionist spirituality. Many also went on to become outstanding priests, bishops, archbishops, and cardinals, some of whom have been beatified or canonized. E.g. Józef Dąbrowski, St. Józef Sebastian Pelczar, St. Józef Bilczewski.

== Collaboration with the Holy See ==
Peter Semenenko collaborated actively with the Holy See. He was an expert on Polish and Eastern matters and, because of his knowledge, he was held in high esteem by popes Gregory XVI, Pio IX and Leo XIII. He worked as a consultant for the Sacred Congregations:

1. of the Index (since 1857)
2. and the Holy Office (since 1873) [now: Doctrine of Faith].

His work was highly praised, and his statements were taken as definitive on a regular basis. He was a member of the following prestigious Papal Academies:

1. Accademia della Religione Cattolica (since 1859),
2. and Accademia degli Arcadi (since 1874).

Semenenko was claimed by Father Wojciech Mleczko in his biography to be "an outstanding erudite", and "freely able to discuss even the most subtle problems."

== Spiritual director ==
He served as priest, confessor and spiritual director to a number of lay and religious persons, including Celina Borzęcka and Jadwiga Borzęcka, Blessed Franciszka Siedliska, and Blessed Marcelina Darowska. He co-founded or helped establish several women's religious congregations, including the Sisters of the Immaculate Conception, Sisters of the Resurrection, Felician Sisters, Sisters of the Holy Family of Nazareth, the Consolers of the Sacred Heart (Belgium), and the Sisters of Adoration Réparatrice (France).

He preached in various churches in Poland, France, Belgium, Bulgaria and Rome.

Much of his attention went towards youth. He desired to inspire their devotion to science and holiness. He laid the foundation for the Resurrectionist system of education.

== Death ==
Peter Semenenko, CR died on November 18, 1886, in Paris, France, in the Odour of sanctity. His remains rest in the Resurrectionist church in Rome (via San Sebastianello 11). His Beatification process was started shortly after World War II.

Pope Leo XIII, upon hearing of Semenenko's death, stated: "Father Semenenko was so esteemed in the whole city of Rome for his virtues. He was the soul of your Congregation and sacrificed his life for its welfare."

== Writings ==
- P. Semenenko, Quid Papa et quid est Episcopatus ex aeterna ac divina ratione necnon quae eorum partes in Ecclesiae infallibili magisterio, Roma – Paris 1870.
- P. Semenenko, Comme la lumière qui éclaire le monde: Sermons sur la foi et la résurrection introduction and translation in French, Rome, 2012.

--, A Light Shining in the World: Sermons on Faith and Man's Resurrection (Lulu.com: Warsaw, 2012)

== Sources ==
- W. Kwiatkowski, La vita di padre Pietro Semenenko, Roma 1952
- J. Iwicki, Resurrectionist Charism. A History of the Congregation of the Resurrection, vol. I, 1836-1886, with James Wahl, Rome 1989
