= Dębina, Podlaskie Voivodeship =

Dębina
- Village
- Location within Poland
- Coordinates: 53°19′18″N 22°47′26″E
- Country: Poland
- Voivodeship: Podlaskie
- County: Mońki
- Gmina: Krypno

Dębina [dɛmˈbina] is a village in the administrative district of Gmina Krypno, within Mońki County, Podlaskie Voivodeship, in north-eastern Poland.
