= Krzywa, Mońki County =

Krzywa
- Village
- Location within Poland
- Coordinates: 53°19′08″N 23°05′08″E
- Country: Poland
- Voivodeship: Podlaskie
- County: Mońki
- Gmina: Jasionówka

Krzywa [ˈkʂɨva] (Belarusian: Крывая, Kryvaja) is a village in the administrative district of Gmina Jasionówka, within Mońki County, Podlaskie Voivodeship, in north-eastern Poland.
