= Dudki-Kolonia =

- Village
- Location within Poland
- Coordinates: 53°22′38″N 22°54′0″E
- Country: Poland
- Voivodeship: Podlaskie
- County: Mońki
- Gmina: Mońki

Dudki-Kolonia [ˈdutki kɔˈlɔɲa] is a village in the administrative district of Gmina Mońki, within Mońki County, Podlaskie Voivodeship, in north-eastern Poland.
