= Stanisław Radziwon =

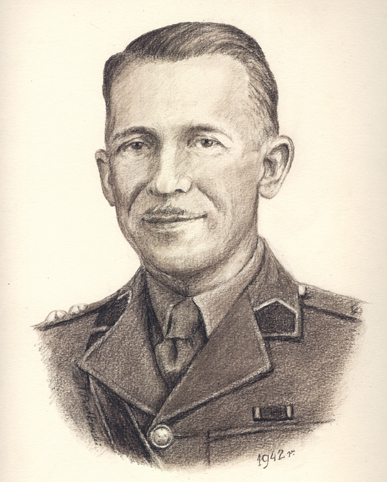

Stanisław Radziwon (29 August 1907 – 10 July 1973) was a Polish administrator, soldier, and active member of the Polish émigré community in Scotland.

== Biography ==
=== Early years ===
Stanisław Radziwon was born in Dolistowo, a large village in the present-day Białystok district of northeastern Poland, to the family of Szymon Radziwon and Urszula (née Kucharska). Faced with the dangerous proximity to the heavy fighting of the Russian forces against advancing Germans during the First World War, his father sent him, his three brothers, and a sister for safety to the Russian interior (the governorates of Mohylev and Minsk). There, in the city of Kaluga, he attended a local school for two years along with his older brother Władysław. During this time, they stayed with the Slawinski family, who were wealthy landowners.

=== Between the two World Wars ===
Stanisław returned to the newly re-established Poland (1918) and continued schooling, attending Adam Mickiewicz High School in Grodno (present Hradna, a large city in Belarus) from 1922 until his final matriculation exams on May 28, 1927. From 15 August 1930 to June 1931 he attended the 5th Infantry Reserves Cadet School at Kraków (Cracow). In the following years, after completing tactical training as a reservist, he was promoted to the rank of lieutenant, his promotion being signed by Lieutenant Colonel Zygmunt Berling, commanding officer for the 6th Legion's Regiment of Infantry, part of the Wilno (present Vilnius, capital of Lithuania) garrison. In private life, he married Wilno-born Maria Szabłowska in December 1930.

In the autumn of 1931, he enrolled in the Faculty of Law at Stefan Batory University in Wilno. On 2 November 1935, he was awarded his master's degree in law. While at the university, he had tried his hand as a journalist, writing articles for local newspapers. Shortly after qualifying as a lawyer, he started working in Wilno's Provincial Administration Office; then, until the outbreak of the Second World War, he held various administrative positions for both the Grodzki-Wileński as well as for Wilensko-Trockie county. During that time, he befriended Colonel Ludwik Bociański governor of Wilno Voivodeship (from 1935 to 1939) and a well known member of the pre-war Polish elite. It turned out to be a lifelong close relationship during the years spent abroad.

Being a trusted colleague of Bociański, Stanisław Radziwon was placed in various exposed but tactical positions: chief of local press and publications censorship department [3], local security referent (from November 1, 1937). From time to time he held temporary duties as governor of Grodzkie-Wileńskie County administration until finally promoted as deputy-governor of Wileńsko-Trockie County administration in the summer of 1939. During this period, he was involved in closing down the local periodical Poprostu connected with the name of the famous Polish communist writer Jerzy Putrament [6] and in the arrest of the very active Communist Stefan Jędrychowski who after the War was a prominent member of the Communist-dominated Polish government.

=== The Second World War ===
The outbreak of War put an end to his career in local government. In anticipation of a Soviet invasion and the consequent occupation of the Wilno region - moves which were the fulfillment of the Molotov–Ribbentrop Pact, Stanisław made his way through the still autonomous Lithuania. He hoped to reach France from there, and join the fight against Germany. It was not easy despite the fact that he had a valid French visa.

The Lithuanian Government, in an attempt to ingratiate themselves with the Nazi government, banned all young people from leaving the country. Many knew that young people would be quick to join the Polish Army which was just being formed in France, in order to continue fighting against Hitler. Using his wit and a false medical certificate of tuberculosis (given to him by a friendly doctor from Kaunas), he overcame many obstacles, travelling through Latvia, Estonia and Sweden.

In November 1939 he arrived in France and on 18 December 1939 signed up as a soldier of the Polish Army. His army identity document bears the number 3138, and the date 30 December 1939. He served in the Armée Polonaise first as a lieutenant commanding a platoon of grenadiers, and then as an aide-de-camp (adjutant). Finally, he was promoted as Commander of the Headquarters of the 6th Regiment of the 2nd Division of Infantry. His division had a chance to fight the enemy, but after its defeat at Maîche, the division was given orders to cross the border to Switzerland. Once there, the soldiers were sent to an internment camp. After only a week, Stanisław Radziwon secretly left the camp for France in an attempt to reach Great Britain and pursue his fight against the Nazis. He vividly described his dramatic escapades and ordeals, in stories published in Wiadomości (published in Scotland) . After many ups and downs he reached Paris, where he hid in a convent. He was able to obtain forged French identity documents and bicycled all the way to the Pyrenees, helped on his way by friendly local people. There he met a smuggler who had been recommended to him and was led by him through the mountains to the outskirts of San Sebastian in Spain. However, the Guardia Civil arrested and imprisoned him and later sent him by train to France again. He escaped from the train, only to be arrested by the Gestapo. Sentenced to death, he miraculously escaped with his life. Relentlessly, he forced his way to Spain again and then to Portugal, where in July 1941 he received his Polish passport from the Legacio da Polonia (Rua das Amoreiras 105 in Lisbon). The passport was issued by the Consular Section in Bern, Switzerland. On 5 August 1941 he received a British visa. The document declared: 'Permitted to land in the United Kingdom on condition that the holder reports at once to the Polish Army headquarters in the United Kingdom and is subject to such further conditions as the Secretary of State may at any time impose'. In a secret British military operation he and other volunteers were then transported from the coast to a boat and then sailed to Gibraltar. He waited six weeks in Gibraltar and finally arrived in Great Britain on 17 October 1941. The next day he was officially drafted into the Army. After lengthy training in England he was sent to Scotland, where in 1943 he joined the 2nd Infantry Battalion, commonly called the 'Tartan Lions'.

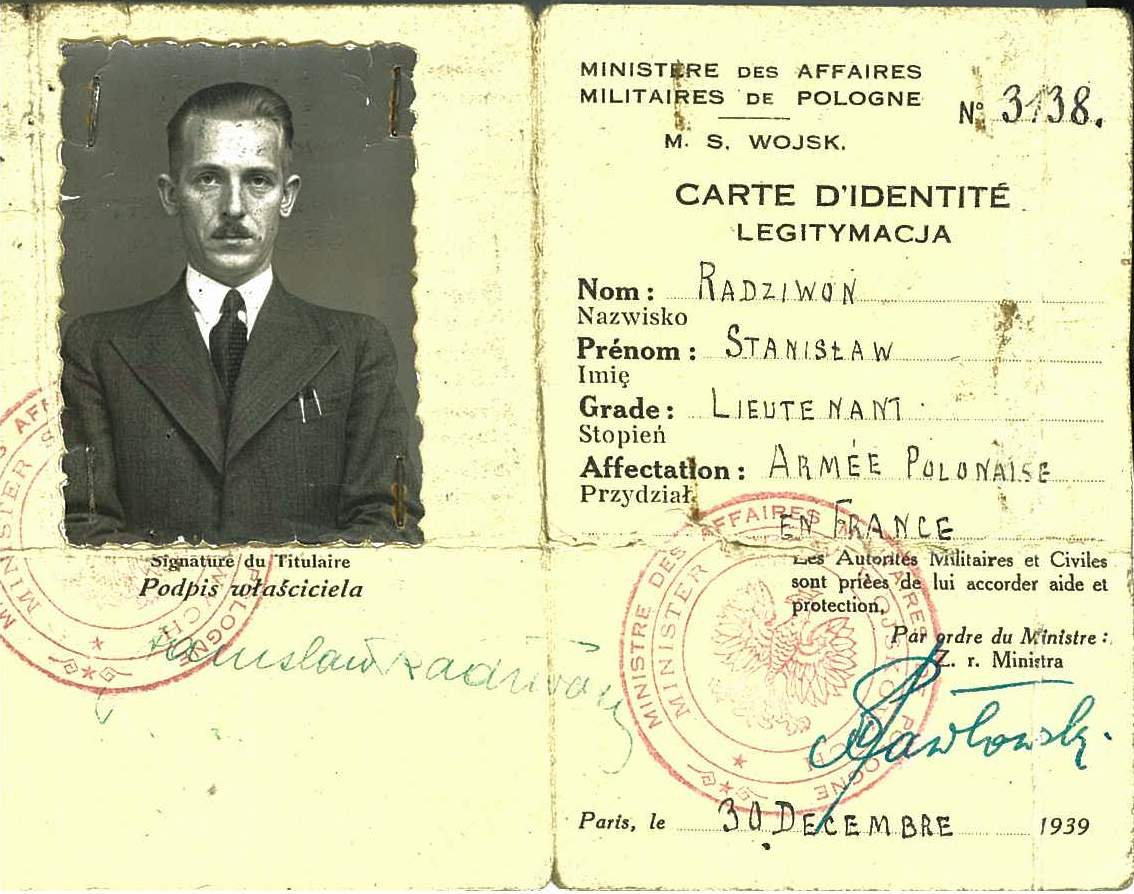
Polish Army (in France) ID

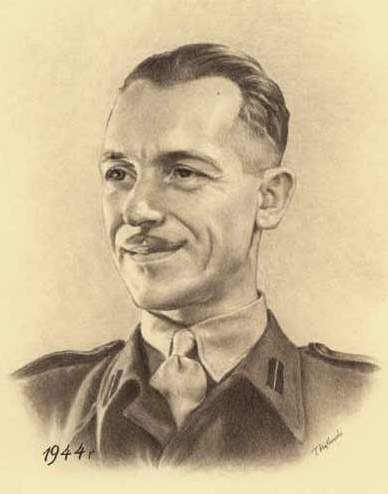
Portrait based on picture taken in 1944

Stanisław Radziwon ended his career in the Polish Army in Britain on 23 October 1946. Until the unit was formally dissolved, he worked as the adjutant and then as the quartermaster. Transferred to the Polish Resettlement Corps, he was officially demobilized on 31 January 1948. For his military service, he was awarded the Polish Silver Cross of Merit and the British Defence Medal for War 1939–45. He ended his military service in the rank of captain.

=== Private life after demobilization ===
While serving in the Polish Resettlement Corps, from 28 March 1947, he took a course at the Faculty of Law in the University of Edinburgh. On 19 December 1947 his Polish diploma was recognized as the Diploma in Administrative Law and Practice at a ceremony in the university. For a short time he tried to establish a legal practice but experienced difficulties from local professionals. In anticipation of years of problems in building a legal practice, he decided to try his luck in business. He bought a run-down hotel in Edinburgh, invested in renovations and so gave a new look and prestige to the Dorchester Hotel. The hotel had an excellent reputation among numerous Polish soldiers settled in Scotland; it was even playfully called the 'Grenadiers Inn'. Official meetings of the 'Tartan Lions' were held in this hotel as well as private gatherings of former comrades in arms. For a time, the famous General Stanisław Maczek worked in the hotel. Many high-ranking Polish officers were abandoned by the British government after the War and left without pensions. As a result, they worked at odd jobs just in order to provide for their families. Stanisław Radziwon sold the Dorchester Hotel in 1965. Thereafter he opted for less absorbing work, and invested in a travel agency. He became the president of Trans-Continental Travel Services Ltd in Glasgow, which still operates today under new ownership. During the war Stanisław was befriended by an aristocratic British officer, Lawrence Younger who was killed in action shortly after at the Battle of Tunisia, but his mother continued the friendship. This closeness evolved into an almost mother-son relationship, after yet another Younger son was also killed in the War. The grieving mother took care of the lonely foreign soldier. The friendship with the Younger family helped him to be introduced and accepted in the aristocratic circles of Scotland. This fact greatly influenced his life and established his social position during his years as an émigré. [2].

A big influence on his life during the years spent in Scotland was retired Colonel Bruce Turnbull, late of the Indian Army and a very romantic relationship with his daughter Barbara Turnbull. For the duration of the war Stanisław was not able to contact his family in Poland. He did not know that in June 1941, the Russians had forcibly exiled part of his family to Siberia, where they spent five years in the Omsk region. As a result, his father died of hunger and malnutrition. His younger brother Romuald [4] [5] was brutally killed (run over in a road accident staged by the Russians). Romuald and Stanisław were very close, after the many years they had spent together in Grodno and Wilno. Romuald who befriended Józef Mackiewicz - through the local very popular publication Słowo, was an underground activist during the War. His second younger brother Piotr, was executed by Russian-influenced local partisans in May 1944. Two other brothers struggled with the Communist reality of post-war Poland, although Władysław (two years older) who had been educated as a doctor in Wilno before the war, became quite successful in medicine. For fear of the persecution of his family and for his own safety Stanisław avoided contacts with Poland. Only after the political changes of 1956, did he have the courage to visit his homeland. After that he used to visit his native country on a regular basis.

=== Involvement in Association of Former Soldiers of Tartan Lions ===
In his private life, Stanisław Radziwon was well known for his organizational skills and dedication to social causes. He was one of the founding members of the Association which brought together the former soldiers of the 'Tartan Lions.' The group was formally established on 15 May 1948, shortly after demobilization. He became the Association's President after Józef Włodarczyk, the former President, left for the US in 1952. The relentless organizational work and keeping up contacts with former grenadiers of the 'Tartan Lions,' made him even better known. As an appreciation of his good work, during consecutive congresses in 1961 and 1963, again and again he was voted to keep his position. In the general assembly of the organization in 1965 in Edinburgh, he resigned his post to Marian Blankenstein. In recognition of the merits, the general assembly awarded him the title Honorary President of the Association. He remained a member of the Board and concentrated on his work as the Chief Editor of Wiadomości. Having more time on his hands now, he traveled extensively not only to Great Britain and Europe, but also to the US, Canada, Brazil, Argentina and even to the Cameroons. Between 1965 and 1967 he campaigned for the unification of his Association with the Association of Former Commandos. Both organizations united in 1967 and the existing newsletter Wiadomosci was renamed Wiadomości-Wypad. In 1967 he also actively participated in organizing an exhibition of Józef Piłsudski mementoes on the Marshal's centennial birthday celebrations. The exhibition was opened on 9 November 1967 by Dr. Wanda Piłsudska, the Marshal's daughter. This exhibition proved to be a success not only with Polish emigrants. In the spring of 1970, after a lengthy trip to Brazil, Stanisław experienced a stroke and partial paralysis. He also lost his ability to read. Health problems caused him to give up his involvement with the Association and the newsletter Wiadomości-Wypad. He turned over the newspaper to his friend and former commando Commander Maciej Zajaczkowski [7]. His health stabilized but caused numerous limitations on his normal life. After three years, Stanisław Radziwon unexpectedly died in his sleep. According to his doctors, he suffered a heart attack.

Stanisław Radziwon was buried at the Roman Catholic cemetery of Mount Vernon in Edinburgh. The inscription on his headstone reads: "Stanisław Radziwon, deputy governor of Wilensko-Trocki County... he gave his soul to God, his heart to Poland and his bones to this soil". After his death, in 1973 he was decorated by the Polish President with the Order of Polonia Restituta (Knight's Cross).

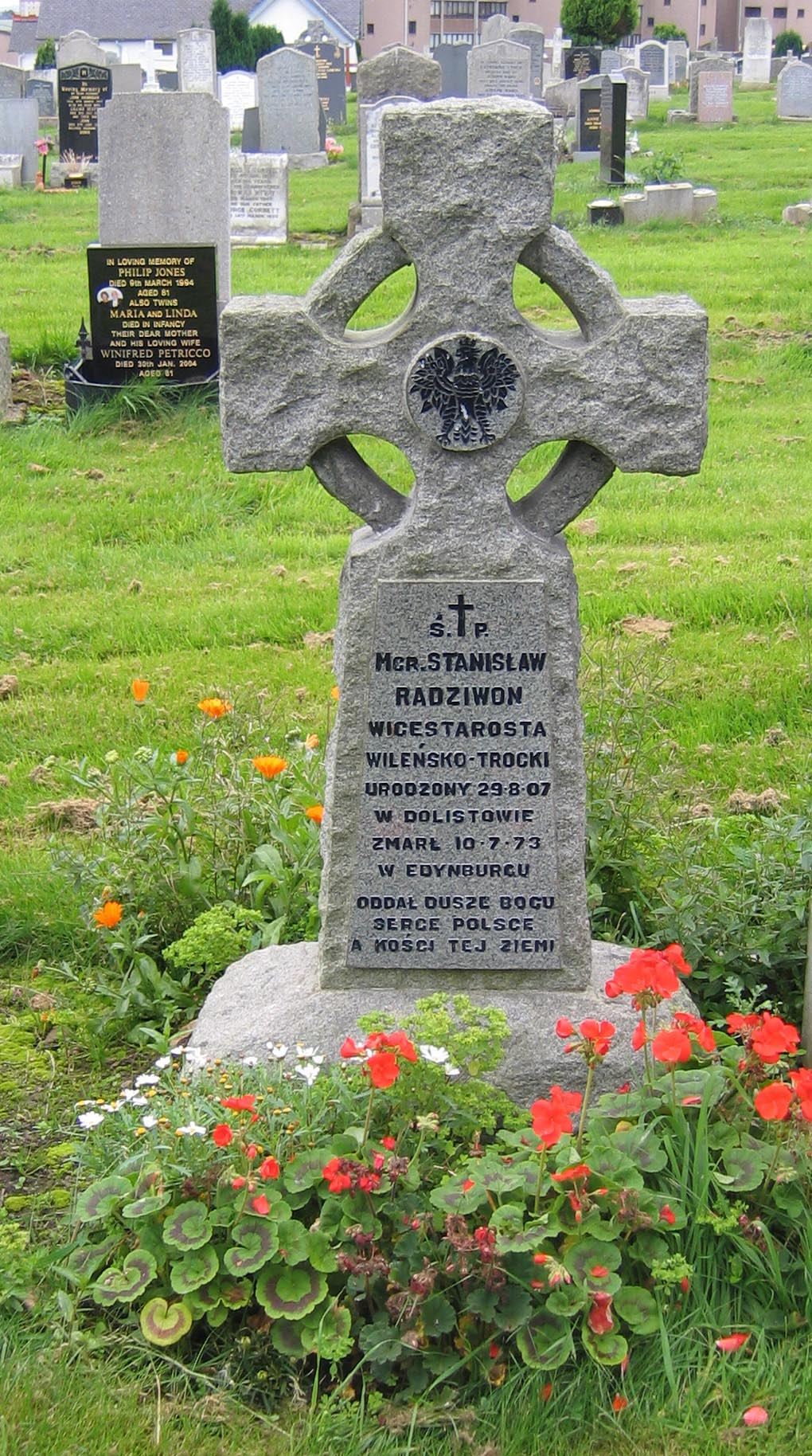
Burial place - Mount Vernon Cemetery, Edinburgh
