= Nowiny-Zdroje =

- Village
- Location within Poland
- Coordinates: 53°19′28.56″N 23°2′39.84″E
- Country: Poland
- Voivodeship: Podlaskie
- County: Mońki
- Gmina: Knyszyn
- Elevation: 179.5 m (589 ft)
- Area code: (+48) 85
- Vehicle registration: BMN

Nowiny-Zdroje [nɔˈvinɨ ˈzdrɔjɛ] is a village in the administrative district of Gmina Knyszyn, within Mońki County, Podlaskie Voivodeship, in north-eastern Poland.
