= Mociesze =

- Village
- Location within Poland
- Coordinates: 53°26′15″N 22°55′45″E
- Country: Poland
- Voivodeship: Podlaskie
- County: Mońki
- Gmina: Jaświły
- Time zone: UTC+1 (CET)
  - Summer (DST): UTC+2 (CEST)

Mociesze [mɔˈt͡ɕɛʂɛ] is a village in the administrative district of Gmina Jaświły, within Mońki County, Podlaskie Voivodeship, in north-eastern Poland.

== History ==
Three Polish citizens were murdered by Nazi Germany in the village during World War II.
