= Zyburty =

- Village
- Location within Poland
- Country: Poland
- Voivodeship: Podlaskie
- County: Mońki
- Gmina: Mońki

Zyburty [zɨˈburtɨ] is a village in the administrative district of Gmina Mońki, within Mońki County, Podlaskie Voivodeship, in north-eastern Poland.
