= Jasionóweczka =

- Village
- Location within Poland
- Coordinates: 53°24′N 23°1′E
- Country: Poland
- Voivodeship: Podlaskie
- County: Mońki
- Gmina: Jasionówka

Jasionóweczka [jaɕɔnuˈvɛt͡ʂka] is a village in the administrative district of Gmina Jasionówka, within Mońki County, Podlaskie Voivodeship, in north-eastern Poland.
