= Rybaki, Mońki County =

Rybaki
- Village
- Location within Poland
- Coordinates: 53°25′55″N 22°43′51″E
- Country: Poland
- Voivodeship: Podlaskie
- County: Mońki
- Gmina: Mońki
- Population: 126

Rybaki [rɨˈbaki] is a village in the administrative district of Gmina Mońki, within Mońki County, Podlaskie Voivodeship, in north-eastern Poland.
