= Dolistowo Nowe =

Nowe Dolistowo
- Village
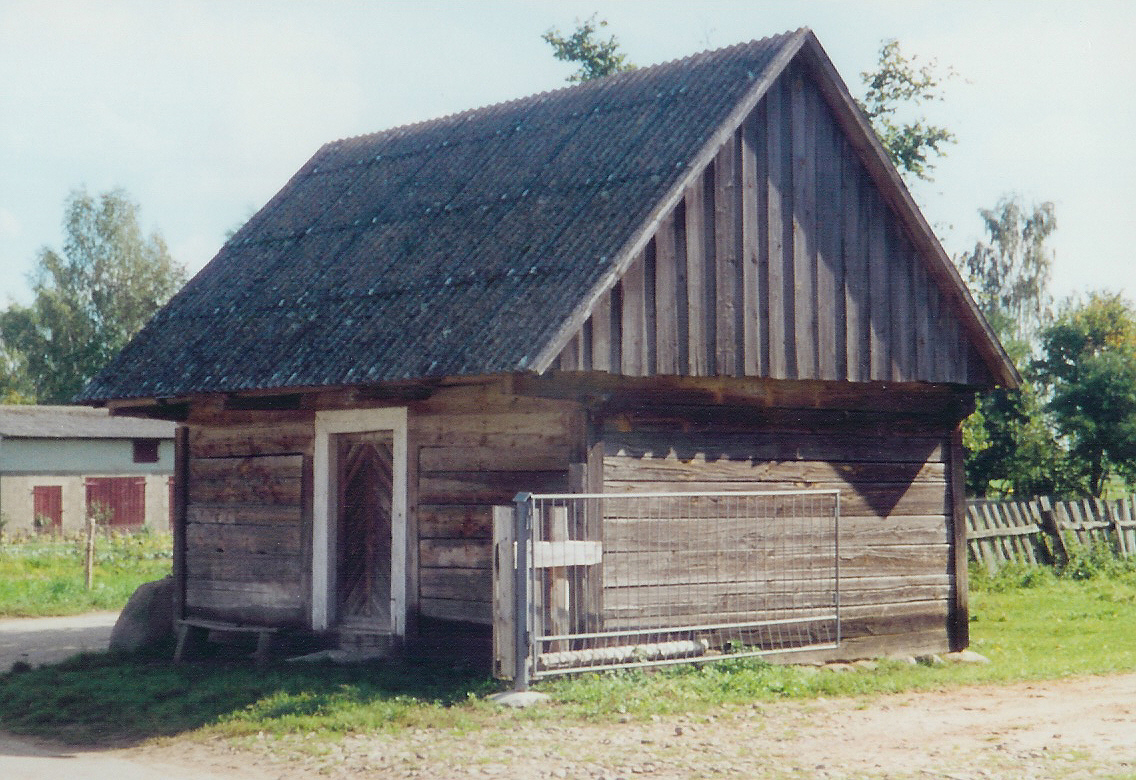
- Granary in Nowe Dolistowo

- Flag Coat of arms

- Location within Poland
- Coordinates: 53°33′00″N 22°55′01″E
- Country: Poland
- Voivodeship: Podlaskie
- County: Mońki
- Gmina: Jaświły
- Time zone: UTC+1 (CET)
  - Summer (DST): UTC+2 (CEST)
- Postal code: 19-124
- Vehicle registration: BMN

Nowe Dolistowo [ˈnɔvɛ dɔlisˈtɔvɔ] is a village in the administrative district of Gmina Jaświły, within Mońki County, Podlaskie Voivodeship, in north-eastern Poland.

According to the 1921 census, the village had a population of 415, 99.8% Polish.
