= Żodzie =

- Village
- Location within Poland
- Coordinates: 53°26′26″N 22°43′55″E
- Country: Poland
- Voivodeship: Podlaskie
- County: Mońki
- Gmina: Mońki
- Population: 50

Żodzie [ˈʐɔd͡ʑɛ] is a village in the administrative district of Gmina Mońki, within Mońki County, Podlaskie Voivodeship, in north-eastern Poland.

Etymologically the name of the village is connected with jaćwieskim or Lithuanian language. Probably was formed in 1501 year as a four-beam emoluments of the church preacher in the nearby Goniadz. For about 300 years were Żodzie village church. At the end of the eighteenth century, the fund missed church. Spirit and Żodzie ceased to be a village church.
