= Dobrzyniówka, Mońki County =

Dobrzyniówka
- Village
- Location within Poland
- Coordinates: 53°21′43″N 23°4′36″E
- Country: Poland
- Voivodeship: Podlaskie
- County: Mońki
- Gmina: Jasionówka
- Population: 40

Dobrzyniówka [dɔbʐɨˈɲufka] is a village in the administrative district of Gmina Jasionówka, within Mońki County, Podlaskie Voivodeship, in north-eastern Poland.
