= Knyszyn-Zamek =

- Village
- Location within Poland
- Coordinates: 53°17′53″N 22°53′31″E
- Country: Poland
- Voivodeship: Podlaskie
- County: Mońki
- Gmina: Knyszyn

Knyszyn-Zamek [ˈknɨʂɨn ˈzamɛk] is a village in the administrative district of Gmina Knyszyn, within Mońki County, Podlaskie Voivodeship, in north-eastern Poland.
