= Ogrodniki, Mońki County =

Ogrodniki
- Village
- Location within Poland
- Coordinates: 53°22′40.09″N 22°56′46.28″E
- Country: Poland
- Voivodeship: Podlaskie
- County: Mońki
- Gmina: Knyszyn
- Postal code: 19-120
- Vehicle registration: BMN

Ogrodniki [ɔɡrɔdˈniki] is a village in the administrative district of Gmina Knyszyn, within Mońki County, Podlaskie Voivodeship, in north-eastern Poland.

== History ==
According to the 1921 census, the village was inhabited by 65 people, among whom 49 were Roman Catholic, 14 Orthodox, 1 Evangelical, and 1 Mosaic. At the same time, 51 inhabitants declared Polish nationality, 14 Belarusian. There were 10 residential buildings in the village.

Five Polish citizens were murdered by Nazi Germany in the village during World War II.
