= Kulesze, Podlaskie Voivodeship =

Kulesze
- Village
- Location within Poland
- Coordinates: 53°24′41″N 22°39′54″E
- Country: Poland
- Voivodeship: Podlaskie
- County: Mońki
- Gmina: Mońki
- Population (approx.): 300

Kulesze [kuˈlɛʂɛ] is a village in the administrative district of Gmina Mońki, within Mońki County, Podlaskie Voivodeship, in north-eastern Poland.
