= Radzie, Podlaskie Voivodeship =

Radzie
- Village
- Location within Poland
- Coordinates: 53°31′05″N 22°56′06″E
- Country: Poland
- Voivodeship: Podlaskie
- County: Mońki
- Gmina: Jaświły
- Elevation: 126 m (413 ft)
- Population: 92
- Postal code: 19-124

Radzie [ˈrad͡ʑɛ] is a village in the administrative district of Gmina Jaświły, in Mońki County, Podlaskie Voivodeship, in northeastern Poland.
