= Jaskra, Podlaskie Voivodeship =

Jaskra
- Village
- Location within Poland
- Coordinates: 53°21′N 22°57′E
- Country: Poland
- Voivodeship: Podlaskie
- County: Mońki
- Gmina: Knyszyn
- Population: 250

Jaskra [ˈjaskra] is a village in the administrative district of Gmina Knyszyn, within Mońki County, Podlaskie Voivodeship, in north-eastern Poland.
