= Zofiówka, Mońki County =

Zofiówka
- Village
- Location within Poland
- Coordinates: 53°21′N 22°59′E
- Country: Poland
- Voivodeship: Podlaskie
- County: Mońki
- Gmina: Knyszyn

Zofiówka [zɔˈfjufka] is a village in the administrative district of Gmina Knyszyn, within Mońki County, Podlaskie Voivodeship, in north-eastern Poland.
