= Kujbiedy =

- Village
- Location within Poland
- Coordinates: 53°23′N 23°3′E
- Country: Poland
- Voivodeship: Podlaskie
- County: Mońki
- Gmina: Jasionówka

Kujbiedy [kui̯ˈbjɛdɨ] is a village in the administrative district of Gmina Jasionówka, within Mońki County, Podlaskie Voivodeship, in north-eastern Poland.
