= Białobrzeskie =

Village in Gmina Krypno, Poland

- Village
- Location within Poland
- Coordinates: 53°16′04″N 22°44′33″E
- Country: Poland
- Voivodeship: Podlaskie
- County: Mońki
- Gmina: Krypno

Białobrzeskie [bjawɔˈbʐɛskʲɛ] is a village in the administrative district of Gmina Krypno, within Mońki County, Podlaskie Voivodeship, in north-eastern Poland.
