= Słomianka, Mońki County =

Village in Gmina Jasionówka, Poland

Słomianka
- Village
- Location within Poland
- Coordinates: 53°22′05″N 23°01′01″E
- Country: Poland
- Voivodeship: Podlaskie
- County: Mońki
- Gmina: Jasionówka

Słomianka [swɔˈmjaŋka] is a village in the administrative district of Gmina Jasionówka, within Mońki County, Podlaskie Voivodeship, in north-eastern Poland.
