= Długołęka, Podlaskie Voivodeship =

Długołęka
- Village
- Location within Poland
- Coordinates: 53°16′N 22°47′E
- Country: Poland
- Voivodeship: Podlaskie
- County: Mońki
- Gmina: Krypno
- Population: 840

Długołęka (Polish pronunciation: [dwuɡɔˈwɛŋka]) is a village in the administrative district of Gmina Krypno, within Mońki County, Podlaskie Voivodeship, in north-eastern Poland.
