= Rutkowskie Duże =

- Village
- Location within Poland
- Coordinates: 53°29′N 22°55′E
- Country: Poland
- Voivodeship: Podlaskie
- County: Mońki
- Gmina: Jaświły

Rutkowskie Duże [rutˈkɔfskʲɛ ˈduʐɛ] is a village in the administrative district of Gmina Jaświły, within Mońki County, Podlaskie Voivodeship, in north-eastern Poland.
