= Kosiorki, Mońki County =

Kosiorki
- Village
- Location within Poland
- Coordinates: 53°28′N 22°49′E
- Country: Poland
- Voivodeship: Podlaskie
- County: Mońki
- Gmina: Mońki
- Population (approx.): 110

Kosiorki [kɔˈɕɔrki] is a village in the administrative district of Gmina Mońki, within Mońki County, Podlaskie Voivodeship, in north-eastern Poland.
