= Lewonie, Gmina Mońki =

Lewonie
- Village
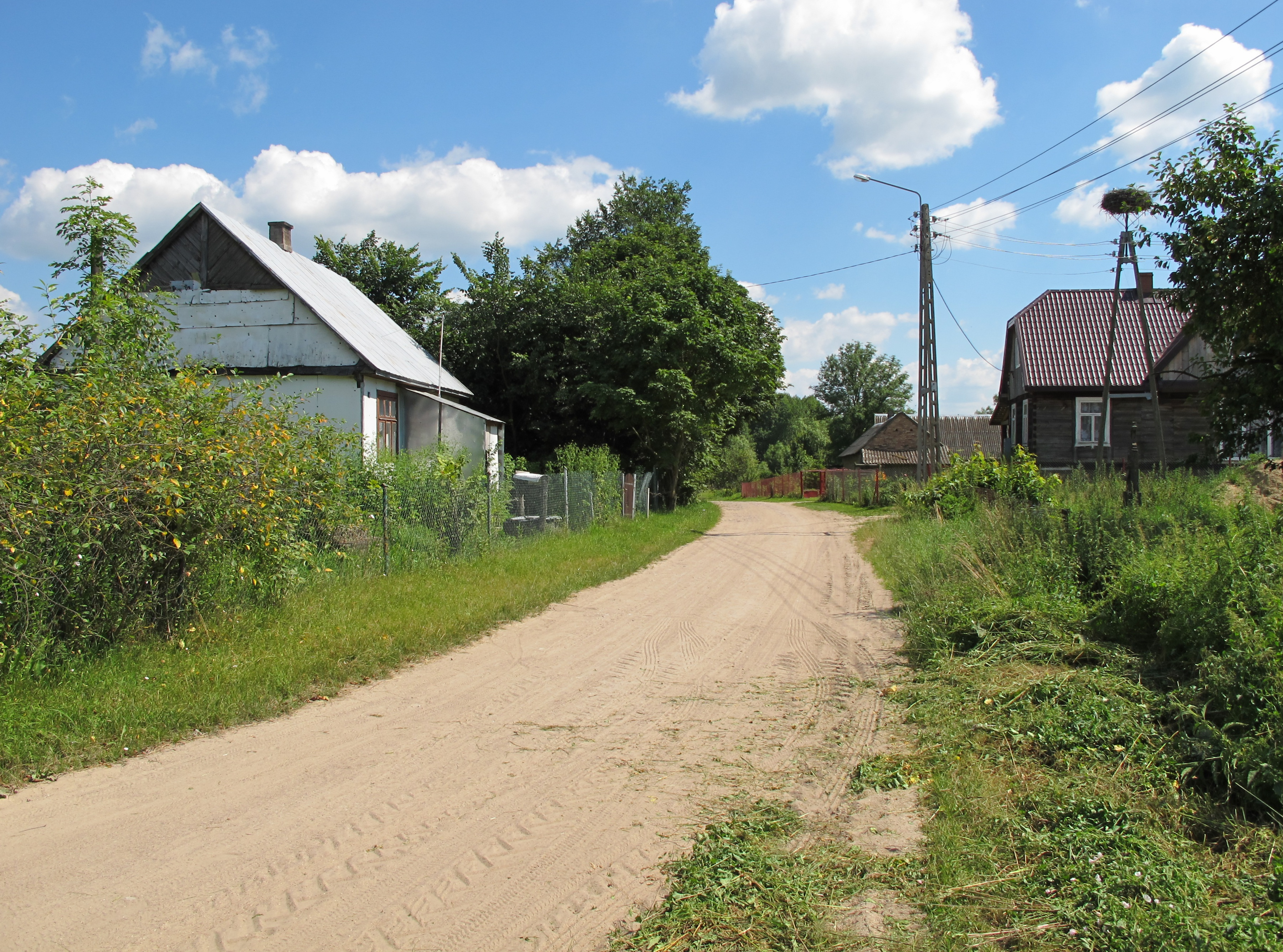
- Street of Lewonie, Gmina Mońki

- Location within Poland
- Coordinates: 53°20′14″N 22°48′36″E
- Country: Poland
- Voivodeship: Podlaskie
- County: Mońki
- Gmina: Mońki

Lewonie [lɛˈvɔɲɛ] is a village in the administrative district of Gmina Mońki, within Mońki County, Podlaskie Voivodeship, in north-eastern Poland.
