= Kamionka, Mońki County =

Kamionka
- Village
- Location within Poland
- Coordinates: 53°25′01″N 22°58′02″E
- Country: Poland
- Voivodeship: Podlaskie
- County: Mońki
- Gmina: Jasionówka
- Population: 323

Kamionka [kaˈmjɔnka] is a village in the administrative district of Gmina Jasionówka, within Mońki County, Podlaskie Voivodeship, in north-eastern Poland.
