= Romejki =

- Village
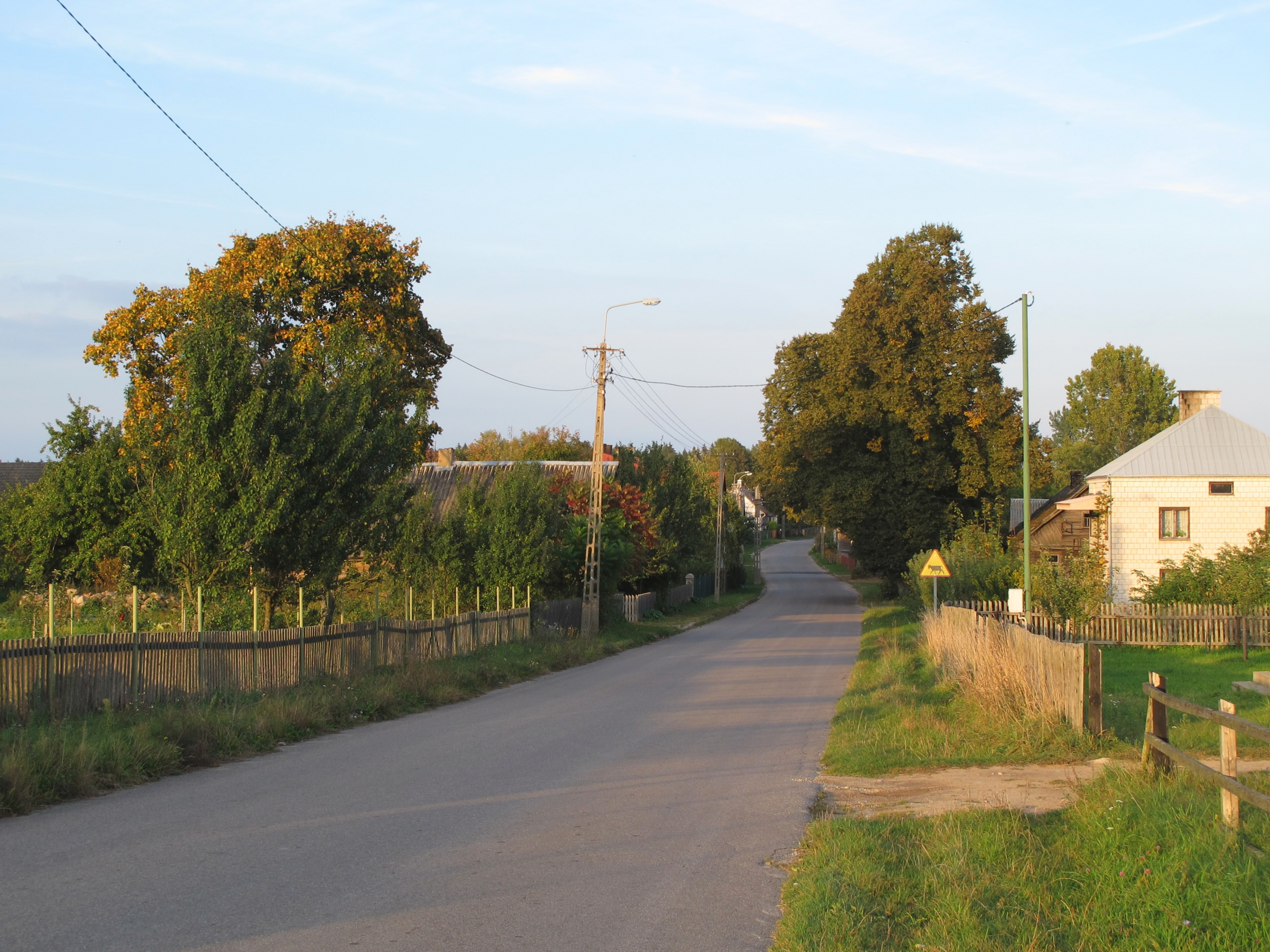

- Location within Poland
- Coordinates: 53°28′N 22°59′E
- Country: Poland
- Voivodeship: Podlaskie
- County: Mońki
- Gmina: Jaświły
- Postal code: 19-124
- Vehicle registration: BMN

Romejki [rɔˈmɛi̯ki] is a village in the administrative district of Gmina Jaświły, within Mońki County, Podlaskie Voivodeship, in north-eastern Poland.

Four Polish citizens were murdered by Nazi Germany in the village during World War II.
