= Potoczyzna =

- Village
- Location within Poland
- Coordinates: 53°25′2″N 22°50′3″E
- Country: Poland
- Voivodeship: Podlaskie
- County: Mońki
- Gmina: Mońki

Potoczyzna [pɔtɔˈt͡ʂɨzna] is a village in the administrative district of Gmina Mońki, within Mońki County, Podlaskie Voivodeship, in north-eastern Poland.
