= Ruda, Mońki County =

Ruda
- Village
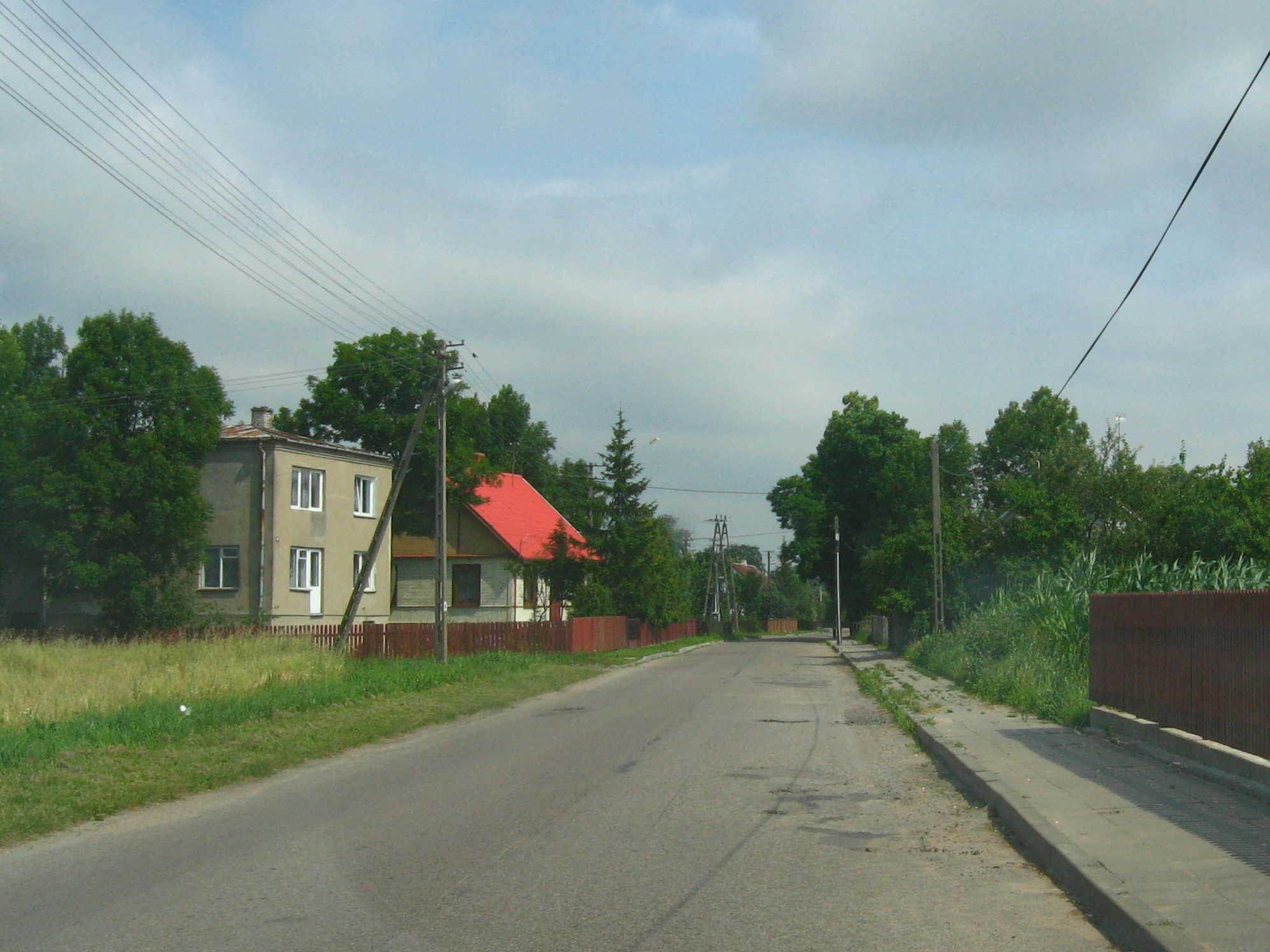

- Location within Poland
- Coordinates: 53°15′59″N 22°54′18″E
- Country: Poland
- Voivodeship: Podlaskie
- County: Mońki
- Gmina: Krypno
- Time zone: UTC+1 (CET)
  - Summer (DST): UTC+2 (CEST)

Ruda [ˈruda] is a village in the administrative district of Gmina Krypno, within Mońki County, Podlaskie Voivodeship, in north-eastern Poland.

== History ==
Three Polish citizens were murdered by Nazi Germany in the village during World War II.
