= Lewonie, Gmina Knyszyn =

Settlement in Podlaskie Voivodeship, northeastern Poland

Lewonie
- Settlement
- Location within Poland
- Coordinates: 53°20′17″N 22°48′32″E
- Country: Poland
- Voivodeship: Podlaskie
- County: Mońki
- Gmina: Knyszyn

Lewonie [lɛˈvɔɲɛ] is a settlement in the administrative district of Gmina Knyszyn, within Mońki County, Podlaskie Voivodeship, in north-eastern Poland.
