= Krasne Stare =

- Village
- Location within Poland
- Coordinates: 53°20′21″N 23°06′40″E
- Country: Poland
- Voivodeship: Podlaskie
- County: Mońki
- Gmina: Jasionówka
- Population: 95

Krasne Stare [ˈkrasnɛ ˈstarɛ] is a village in the administrative district of Gmina Jasionówka, within Mońki County, Podlaskie Voivodeship, in north-eastern Poland.
