= Koziniec, Podlaskie Voivodeship =

Koziniec
- Village
- Location within Poland
- Coordinates: 53°26′N 22°59′E
- Country: Poland
- Voivodeship: Podlaskie
- County: Mońki
- Gmina: Jasionówka

Koziniec [kɔˈʑiɲɛt͡s] is a village in the administrative district of Gmina Jasionówka, within Mońki County, Podlaskie Voivodeship, in north-eastern Poland.
