= Góra, Mońki County =

Góra
- Village
- Location within Poland
- Coordinates: 53°13′50″N 22°51′30″E
- Country: Poland
- Voivodeship: Podlaskie
- County: Mońki
- Gmina: Krypno

Góra [ˈɡura] is a village in the administrative district of Gmina Krypno, within Mońki County, Podlaskie Voivodeship, in north-eastern Poland.
