= Oliszki, Mońki County =

Village in Gmina Mońki, Poland

Oliszki
- Village
- Location within Poland
- Coordinates: 53°24′12″N 22°45′16″E
- Country: Poland
- Voivodeship: Podlaskie
- County: Mońki
- Gmina: Mońki

Oliszki [ɔˈliʂki] is a village in the administrative district of Gmina Mońki, within Mońki County, Podlaskie Voivodeship, in north-eastern Poland.
