= Przytulanka =

- Village
- Location within Poland
- Coordinates: 53°23′N 22°51′E
- Country: Poland
- Voivodeship: Podlaskie
- County: Mońki
- Gmina: Mońki
- Population: 380

Przytulanka [pʂɨtuˈlaŋka] is a village in the administrative district of Gmina Mońki, within Mońki County, Podlaskie Voivodeship, in north-eastern Poland.
