= Kalinówka Królewska =

- Village
- Location within Poland
- Coordinates: 53°25′N 22°58′E
- Country: Poland
- Voivodeship: Podlaskie
- County: Mońki
- Gmina: Jasionówka

Kalinówka Królewska [kaliˈnufka kruˈlɛfska] is a village in the administrative district of Gmina Jasionówka, within Mońki County, Podlaskie Voivodeship, in north-eastern Poland.
