= Wojszki, Mońki County =

Wojszki
- Village
- Location within Poland
- Coordinates: 53°23′18″N 22°44′12″E
- Country: Poland
- Voivodeship: Podlaskie
- County: Mońki
- Gmina: Mońki

Wojszki [ˈvɔi̯ʂki] is a village in the administrative district of Gmina Mońki, within Mońki County, Podlaskie Voivodeship, in north-eastern Poland.
