= Kąty, Mońki County =

Kąty
- Village
- Location within Poland
- Coordinates: 53°25′07″N 22°58′09″E
- Country: Poland
- Voivodeship: Podlaskie
- County: Mońki
- Gmina: Jasionówka

Kąty [ˈkɔntɨ] is a village in the administrative district of Gmina Jasionówka, within Mońki County, Podlaskie Voivodeship, in north-eastern Poland.

According to the 1921 census, the village was inhabited by 208 people, among whom 11 were Roman Catholic, 196 Orthodox, and 1 Mosaic. At the same time, 129 inhabitants declared Polish nationality, 79 Belarusian. There were 32 residential buildings in the village.
