= Boguszewo =

Boguszewo may refer to the following places:

- Boguszewo, Kuyavian-Pomeranian Voivodeship (north-central Poland)
- Boguszewo, Gmina Mońki in Podlaskie Voivodeship (north-east Poland)
- Boguszewo, Gmina Trzcianne in Podlaskie Voivodeship (north-east Poland)
- Boguszewo, Warmian-Masurian Voivodeship (north Poland)
