= Sobieski, Podlaskie Voivodeship =

Sobieski
- Village
- Location within Poland
- Coordinates: 53°25′14″N 22°44′23″E
- Country: Poland
- Voivodeship: Podlaskie
- County: Mońki
- Gmina: Mońki
- Population: 40

Sobieski [sɔˈbjɛski] is a village in the administrative district of Gmina Mońki, within Mońki County, Podlaskie Voivodeship, in north-eastern Poland.
