= Morusy =

- Village
- Location within Poland
- Coordinates: 53°14′06″N 22°48′38″E
- Country: Poland
- Voivodeship: Podlaskie
- County: Mońki
- Gmina: Krypno

Morusy [mɔˈrusɨ] is a village in the administrative district of Gmina Krypno, within Mońki County, Podlaskie Voivodeship, in north-eastern Poland.
