= Bajki-Zalesie =

- Village
- Location within Poland
- Coordinates: 53°18′N 22°45′E
- Country: Poland
- Voivodeship: Podlaskie
- County: Mońki
- Gmina: Krypno

Bajki-Zalesie [ˈbai̯ki zaˈlɛɕɛ] is a village in the administrative district of Gmina Krypno, within Mońki County, Podlaskie Voivodeship, in north-eastern Poland.

According to the 1921 census, the village was inhabited by 420 people, among whom 410 were Roman Catholic, 5 Orthodox, and 5 Mosaic. At the same time, 419 inhabitants declared Polish nationality and 1 Belarusian. There were 73 residential buildings in the village.
