= Świerzbienie =

- Village
- Location within Poland
- Coordinates: 53°25′19″N 22°48′3″E
- Country: Poland
- Voivodeship: Podlaskie
- County: Mońki
- Gmina: Mońki

Świerzbienie (Polish pronunciation: [ɕfjɛʐˈbjɛɲɛ]) is a village in the administrative district of Gmina Mońki, within Mońki County, Podlaskie Voivodeship, in north-eastern Poland.
