= Ginie, Podlaskie Voivodeship =

Ginie
- Settlement
- Location within Poland
- Coordinates: 53°25′01″N 22°45′01″E
- Country: Poland
- Voivodeship: Podlaskie
- County: Mońki
- Gmina: Mońki

Ginie [ˈɡiɲɛ] is a settlement in the administrative district of Gmina Mońki, within Mońki County, Podlaskie Voivodeship, in north-eastern Poland.
