= Kiślaki, Mońki County =

Kiślaki
- Village
- Location within Poland
- Coordinates: 53°23′57″N 22°41′47″E
- Country: Poland
- Voivodeship: Podlaskie
- County: Mońki
- Gmina: Mońki
- Population: 100

Kiślaki [kiˈɕlaki] is a village in the administrative district of Gmina Mońki, within Mońki County, Podlaskie Voivodeship, in north-eastern Poland.
