= Krypno =

- Village
- Location within Poland
- Coordinates: 53°16′31″N 22°52′18″E
- Country: Poland
- Voivodeship: Podlaskie
- County: Mońki
- Gmina: Krypno

Krypno [ˈkrɨpnɔ] is a village in Mońki County, Podlaskie Voivodeship, in north-eastern Poland. It is the seat of the gmina (administrative district) called Gmina Krypno.
