= Jasionówka, Mońki County =

Jasionówka
- Village
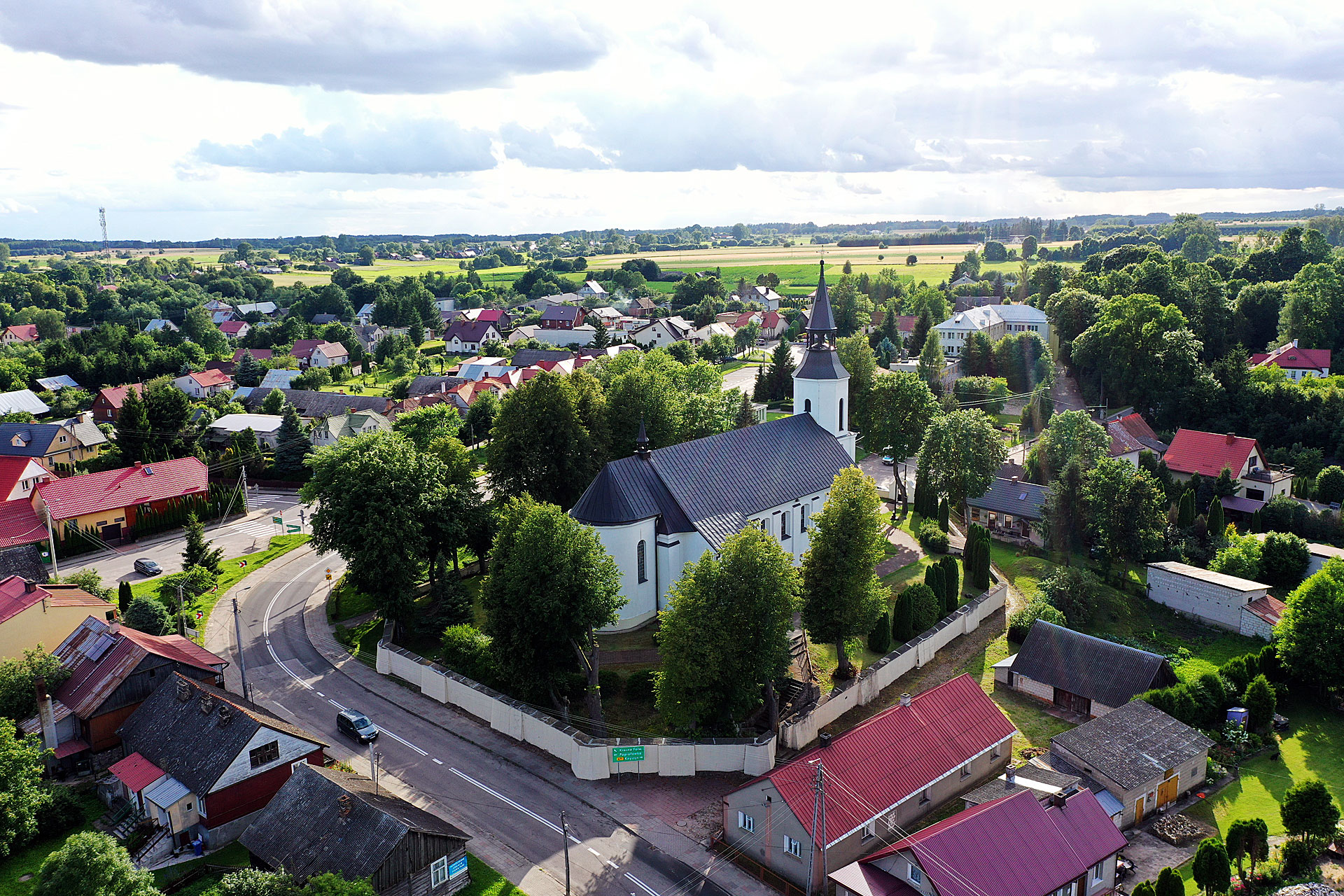
- Aerial view with the Holy Trinity church in the center

- Location within Poland
- Coordinates: 53°24′N 23°2′E
- Country: Poland
- Voivodeship: Podlaskie
- County: Mońki
- Gmina: Jasionówka

Population (approx.)
  - Total: 860
- Time zone: UTC+1 (CET)
  - Summer (DST): UTC+2 (CEST)
- Website: http://www.jasionowka.pl

Jasionówka ([jaɕɔˈnufka], Yiddish: יאַשינעווקע, romanized: Yashinovka) is a village in Mońki County, Podlaskie Voivodeship, in north-eastern Poland. It is the seat of the gmina (administrative district) called Gmina Jasionówka.

== History ==
It was a private town, administratively located in the Bielsk County in the Podlaskie Voivodeship in the Lesser Poland Province of the Kingdom of Poland.

Jasionówka had 1,154 Jewish residents in 1897, and 1,306 in 1921. Nearly all of them were murdered by the Germans in World War II.

Following the German-Soviet invasion of Poland, which started World War II in September 1939, the town was occupied by the Soviet Union until 1941, and then by Nazi Germany until 1944.

== Notable residents ==
- Rabbi Gedaliah Silverstone
