= Gmina Knyszyn =

Gmina Knyszyn Knyszyn Commune
- Gmina
- Coat of arms

- Gmina Knyszyn within the Mońki County
- Coordinates (Knyszyn): 53°18′47″N 22°55′3″E
- Country: Poland
- Voivodeship: Podlaskie
- County: Mońki
- Seat: Knyszyn

Area
  - Total: 127.68 km^{2} (49.30 sq mi)

Population (2006)
  - Total: 4,942
  - Density: 38.71/km^{2} (100.2/sq mi)
  - Urban: 2,835
  - Rural: 2,107
- Website: https://www.knyszyn.pl/

Gmina Knyszyn is an urban-rural gmina (administrative district) in Mońki County, Podlaskie Voivodeship, in north-eastern Poland. Its seat is the town of Knyszyn, which lies approximately 13 kilometres (8 mi) south-east of Mońki and 28 km (17 mi) north-west of the regional capital Białystok.

The gmina covers an area of 127.68 square kilometres (49.3 sq mi), and as of 2006 its total population is 4,942 (out of which the population of Knyszyn amounts to 2,835, and the population of the rural part of the gmina is 2,107).

The gmina contains part of the protected area called Knyszyń Forest Landscape Park.

== Villages ==
Apart from the town of Knyszyn, Gmina Knyszyn contains the villages and settlements of Chobotki, Czechowizna, Grądy, Guzy, Jaskra, Kalinówka Kościelna, Knyszyn-Cisówka, Knyszyn-Zamek, Lewonie, Nowiny Kasjerskie, Nowiny-Zdroje, Ogrodniki, Poniklica, Stoczek, Wodziłówka, Wojtówce and Zofiówka.

== Neighbouring gminas ==
Gmina Knyszyn is bordered by the gminas of Czarna Białostocka, Dobrzyniewo Duże, Jasionówka, Krypno and Mońki.
