= Gmina Krypno =

Gmina Krypno Krypno Commune
- Gmina
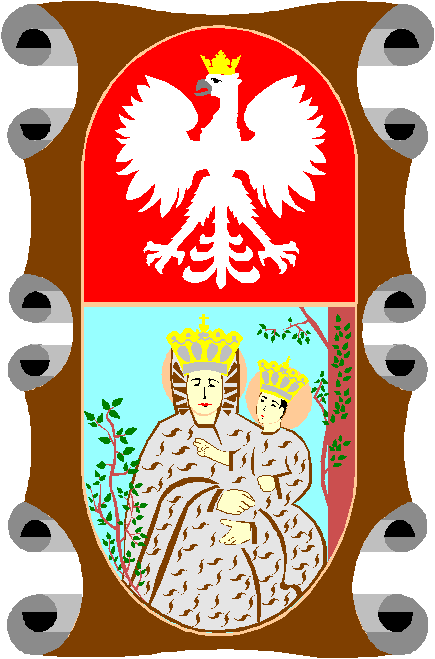
- Coat of arms

- Gmina Krypno within the Mońki County
- Coordinates (Krypno): 53°16′31″N 22°52′18″E
- Country: Poland
- Voivodeship: Podlaskie
- County: Mońki
- Seat: Krypno

Area
  - Total: 112.69 km^{2} (43.51 sq mi)

Population (2006)
  - Total: 4,108
  - Density: 36.45/km^{2} (94.42/sq mi)
- Website: Gminakrypno

Gmina Krypno is a rural gmina (administrative district) in Mońki County, Podlaskie Voivodeship, in north-eastern Poland. Its seat is the village of Krypno, which lies approximately 15 kilometres (9 mi) south of Mońki and 27 km (17 mi) north-west of the regional capital Białystok.

The gmina covers an area of 112.69 square kilometres (43.5 sq mi), and as of 2006 its total population is 4,108.

== Villages ==
Gmina Krypno contains the villages and settlements of Bajki-Zalesie, Białobrzeskie, Dębina, Długołęka, Góra, Kruszyn, Krypno, Krypno Wielkie, Kulesze-Chobotki, Morusy, Peńskie, Rekle, Ruda, Zastocze and Zygmunty.

== Neighbouring gminas ==
Gmina Krypno is bordered by the gminas of Dobrzyniewo Duże, Knyszyn, Mońki, Trzcianne and Tykocin.
