= Boguszewo, Gmina Mońki =

Boguszewo
- Village
- Location within Poland
- Coordinates: 53°20′09″N 22°46′50″E
- Country: Poland
- Voivodeship: Podlaskie
- County: Mońki
- Gmina: Mońki

Boguszewo [bɔɡuˈʂɛvɔ] is a village in the administrative district of Gmina Mońki, within Mońki County, Podlaskie Voivodeship, in north-eastern Poland.

According to the 1921 census, the village was inhabited by 587 people, among whom 572 were Roman Catholic, 7 Orthodox, and 8 Mosaic. At the same time, 580 inhabitants declared Polish nationality, 7 Belarusian and 7 other. There were 91 residential buildings in the village.
