= Gmina Jasionówka =

Gmina Jasionówka Jasionówka Commune
- Gmina
- Coat of arms

- Gmina Jasionówka within the Mońki County
- Coordinates (Jasionówka): 53°24′N 23°2′E
- Country: Poland
- Voivodeship: Podlaskie
- County: Mońki
- Seat: Jasionówka

Area
  - Total: 96.73 km^{2} (37.35 sq mi)

Population (2006)
  - Total: 2,962
  - Density: 30.62/km^{2} (79.31/sq mi)
- Website: http://www.jasionowka.pl/

Gmina Jasionówka is a rural gmina (administrative district) in Mońki County, Podlaskie Voivodeship, in north-eastern Poland. Its seat is the village of Jasionówka, which lies approximately 16 kilometres (10 mi) east of Mońki and 33 km (21 mi) north of the regional capital Białystok.

The gmina covers an area of 96.73 square kilometres (37.3 sq mi), and as of 2006 its total population is 2,962.

== Villages ==
Gmina Jasionówka contains the villages and settlements of Brzozówka Folwarczna, Czarnystok, Dobrzyniówka, Górnystok, Jasionóweczka, Jasionówka, Kalinówka Królewska, Kamionka, Kąty, Koziniec, Krasne Folwarczne, Krasne Małe, Krasne Stare, Krzywa, Kujbiedy, Łękobudy, Milewskie and Słomianka.

== Neighbouring gminas ==
Gmina Jasionówka is bordered by the gminas of Czarna Białostocka, Jaświły, Knyszyn and Korycin.
