= Dolistowo Stare =

Stare Dolistowo
- Village
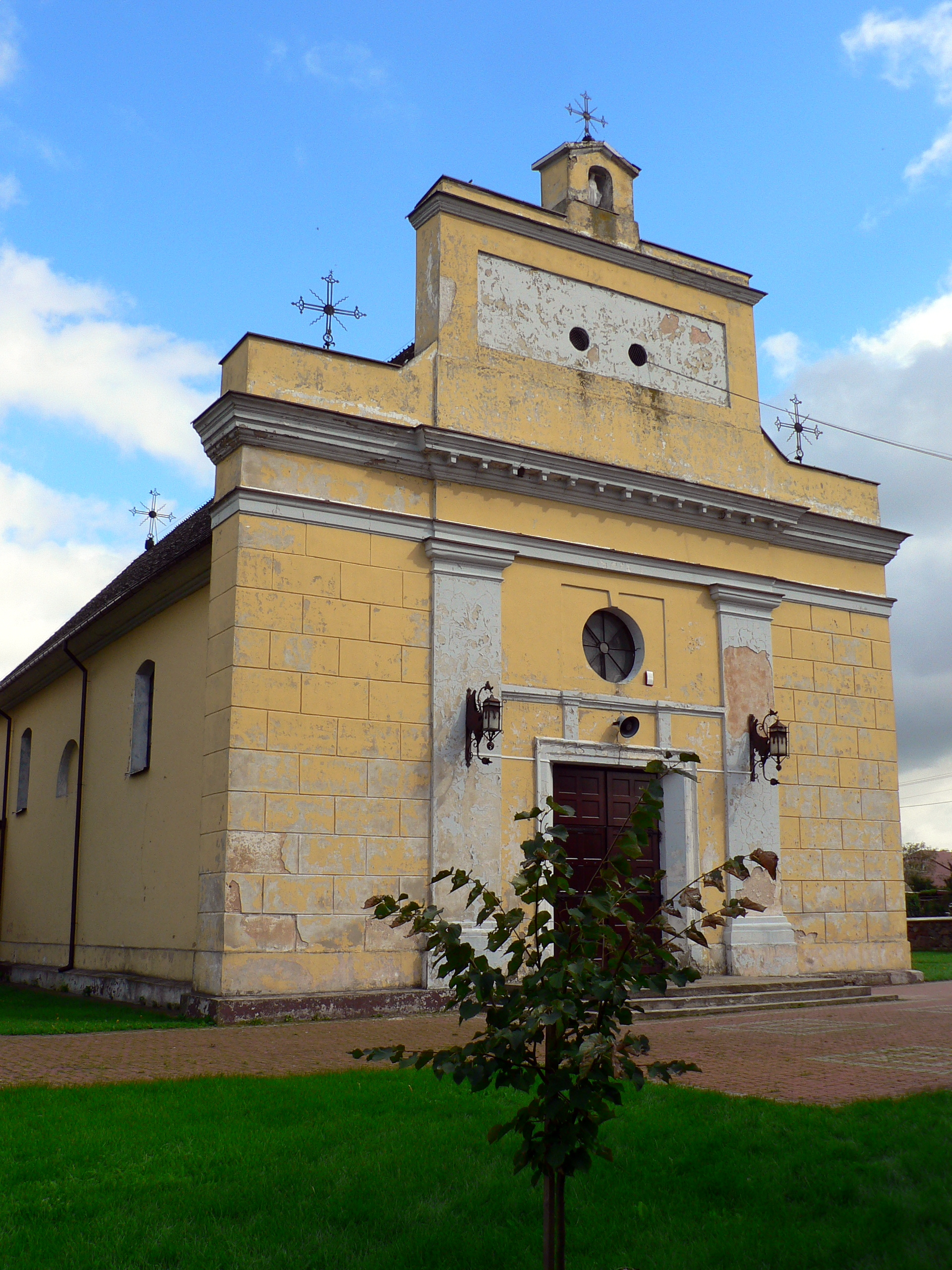
- St. Lawrence church

- Location within Poland
- Coordinates: 53°33′N 22°55′E
- Country: Poland
- Voivodeship: Podlaskie
- County: Mońki
- Gmina: Jaświły
- Time zone: UTC+1 (CET)
  - Summer (DST): UTC+2 (CEST)
- Postal code: 19-124
- Vehicle registration: BMN

Stare Dolistowo [ˈstarɛ dɔlisˈtɔvɔ] is a village in the administrative district of Gmina Jaświły, within Mońki County, Podlaskie Voivodeship, in north-eastern Poland.

== History ==
In the centre of the village stands the parish church of St. Lawrence, dating from the late 18th century (a single-nave church with a Neoclassical façade), founded by Izabella Branicka née Poniatowska, together with a historic belfry dating from 1803 and a presbytery. Preserved documents show that the Catholic community from the Dolistowo area was organised and centred around the existing church as early as the reign of Casimir IV Jagiellon (who died in 1492). The official date of the establishment of the parish in Dolistowo is 6 February 1500.

Dolistowo Stare was a former possession of the Plater family.

During the Third Partition of Poland, in 1795, the village was annexed by Prussia. In 1807, when the short-lived Polish Duchy of Warsaw was established, its border ran along the Biebrza River; as a result, after 1815, all the villages belonging to what is now Gmina Jaświły came to lie within the borders of the Russian Empire.

=== 20th century ===
During World War I, the Germans invaded the area in 1915.

After Poland regained its independence in 1918, Dolistowo came within the borders of the Polish state. According to the 1921 census, the village had a population of 847, 99.8% Polish.

==== World War II ====
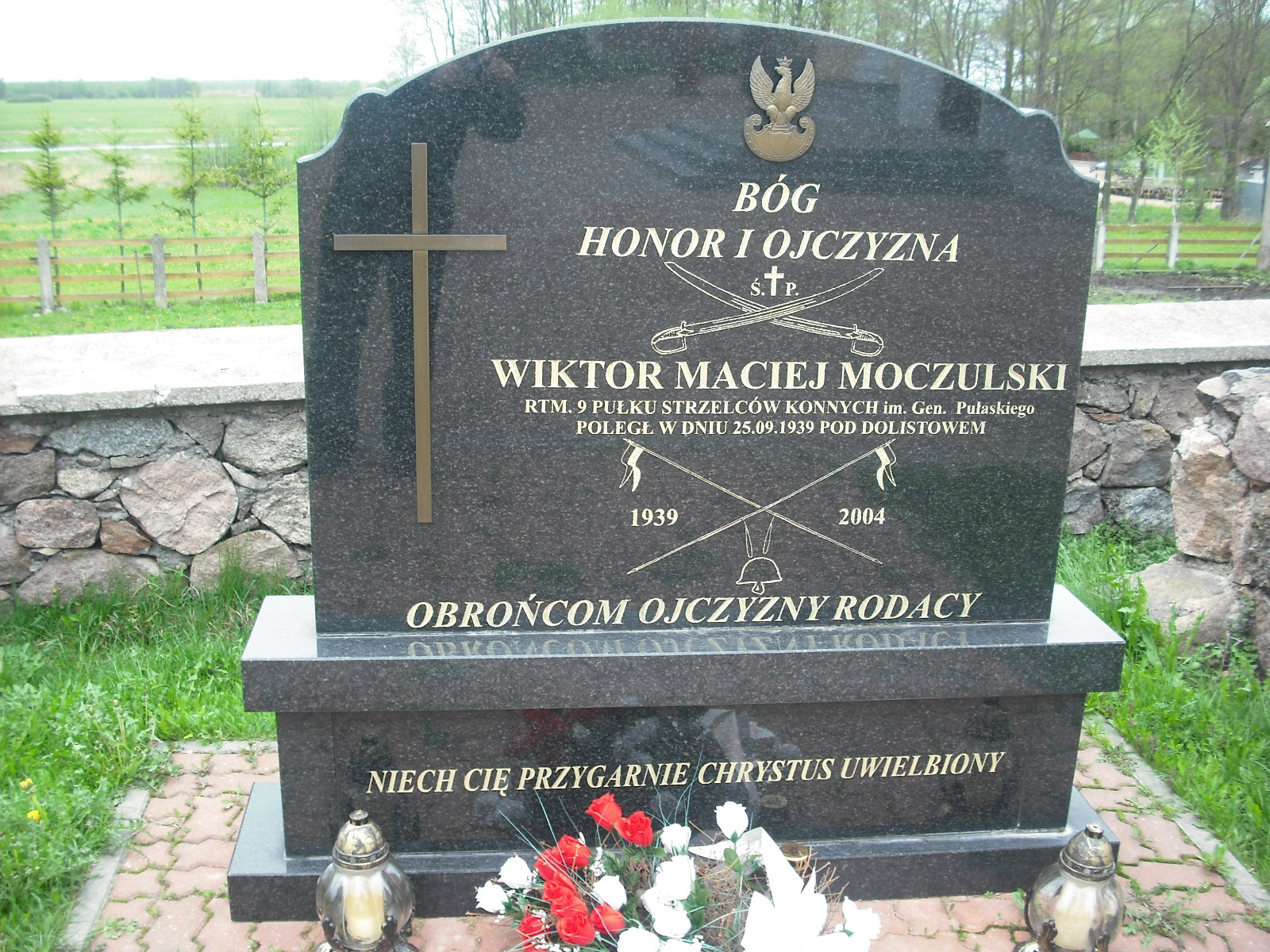
Memorial to Wiktor Moczulski

Following the German-Soviet invasion of Poland in September 1939, there is documented evidence of Hubal's unit halting in Dolistowo and a skirmish taking place there with Soviet troops. A commemorative plaque to Captain Wiktor Moczulski, who fell in that battle, is located by the church. From 26 September 1939 to June 1941, the area of the present-day Gmina Jaświły was under Soviet occupation.

From 22 June 1941, units of the 10th Soviet Army, using the Osowiecki Fortification Area as a base, resisted the advancing German forces for several days before eventually withdrawing; the area then came under German occupation, which lasted until August 1944.
