= Dzięciołowo, Podlaskie Voivodeship =

Dzięciołowo
- Village
- Location within Poland
- Coordinates: 53°33′N 23°0′E
- Country: Poland
- Voivodeship: Podlaskie
- County: Mońki
- Gmina: Jaświły

Dzięciołowo [d͡ʑɛnt͡ɕɔˈwɔvɔ] is a village in the administrative district of Gmina Jaświły, within Mońki County, Podlaskie Voivodeship, in north-eastern Poland.
