= Szaciły, Mońki County =

Szaciły
- Village
- Location within Poland
- Coordinates: 53°30′01″N 22°55′01″E
- Country: Poland
- Voivodeship: Podlaskie
- County: Mońki
- Gmina: Jaświły

Szaciły [ʂaˈt͡ɕiwɨ] is a village in the administrative district of Gmina Jaświły, within Mońki County, Podlaskie Voivodeship, in north-eastern Poland.
