= Gmina Jaświły =

Gmina Jaświły Jaświły Commune
- Gmina
- Gmina Jaświły within the Mońki County
- Coordinates (Jaświły): 53°28′N 22°56′E
- Country: Poland
- Voivodeship: Podlaskie
- County: Mońki
- Seat: Jaświły

Area
  - Total: 175.41 km^{2} (67.73 sq mi)

Population (2006)
  - Total: 5,427
  - Density: 30.94/km^{2} (80.13/sq mi)
- Website: http://www.jaswily.iap.pl/

Gmina Jaświły is a rural gmina (administrative district) in Mońki County, Podlaskie Voivodeship, in north-eastern Poland. Its seat is the village of Jaświły, which lies approximately 12 kilometres (7 mi) north-east of Mońki and 42 km (26 mi) north of the regional capital Białystok.

The gmina covers an area of 175.41 square kilometres (67.7 sq mi), and as of 2006 its total population is 5,427.

== Villages ==
Gmina Jaświły contains the villages and settlements of Bagno, Bobrówka, Brzozowa, Dzięciołowo, Gurbicze, Jadeszki, Jaświłki, Jaświły, Mikicin, Mociesze, Moniuszki, Nowe Dolistowo, Radzie, Romejki, Rutkowskie Duże, Rutkowskie Małe, Stare Dolistowo, Starowola, Stożnowo, Szaciły, Szpakowo and Zabiele.

== Neighbouring gminas ==
Gmina Jaświły is bordered by the gminas of Goniądz, Jasionówka, Korycin, Mońki, Suchowola and Sztabin.
