= Gmina Mońki =

Gmina Mońki Mońki Commune
- Gmina
- Coat of arms

- Gmina Mońki within the Mońki County
- Coordinates (Mońki): 53°24′N 22°48′E
- Country: Poland
- Voivodeship: Podlaskie
- County: Mońki
- Seat: Mońki

Area
  - Total: 161.56 km^{2} (62.38 sq mi)

Population (2006)
  - Total: 15,611
  - Density: 96.627/km^{2} (250.26/sq mi)
  - Urban: 10,455
  - Rural: 5,156
- Website: http://www.monki.um.pl/

Gmina Mońki is an urban-rural gmina (administrative district) in Mońki County, Podlaskie Voivodeship, in northeastern Poland. Its seat is the town of Mońki, which lies approximately 40 kilometres (25 mi) northwest of the regional capital Białystok.

The gmina covers an area of 161.56 square kilometres (62.4 sq mi), and as of 2006 its total population is 15,611 (out of which the population of Mońki amounts to 10,455, and the population of the rural part of the gmina is 5,156).

== Villages ==
Apart from the town of Mońki, Gmina Mońki contains the villages and settlements of Boguszewo, Ciesze, Czekołdy, Dudki, Dudki-Kolonia, Dziękonie, Dzieżki, Ginie, Hornostaje, Hornostaje-Osada, Jaski, Kiślaki, Koleśniki, Kołodzież, Konopczyn, Kosiorki, Kropiwnica, Krzeczkowo, Kuczyn, Kulesze, Lewonie, Łupichy, Magnusze, Masie, Mejły, Moniuszeczki, Ołdaki, Oliszki, Potoczyzna, Przytulanka, Pyzy, Rusaki, Rybaki, Sikory, Sobieski, Świerzbienie, Waśki, Wojszki, Zalesie, Zblutowo, Znoski, Żodzie and Zyburty.

== Neighbouring gminas ==
Gmina Mońki is bordered by the gminas of Goniądz, Jaświły, Knyszyn, Krypno and Trzcianne.
