= Jaświły =

- Village
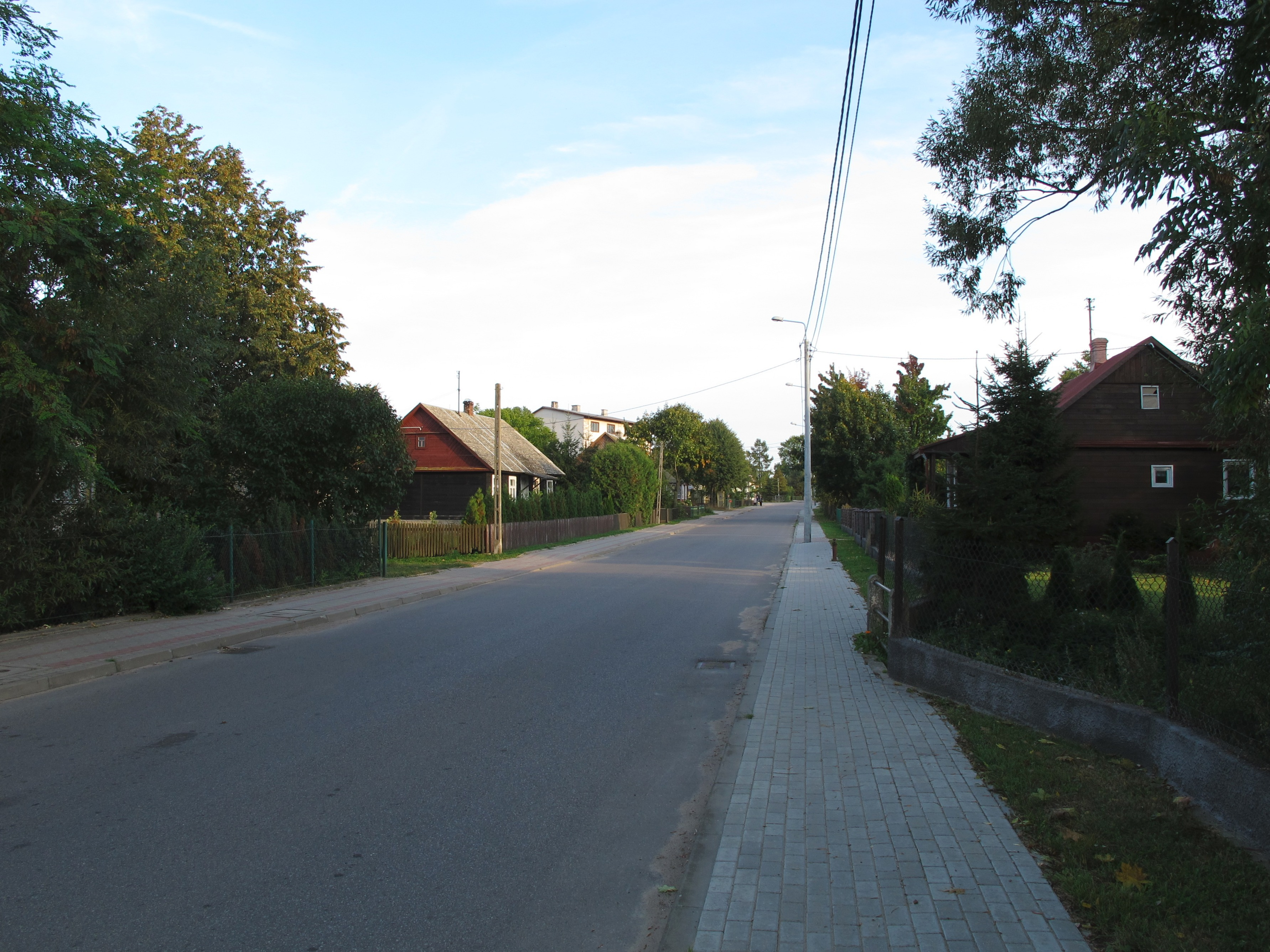

- Location within Poland
- Coordinates: 53°28′N 22°56′E
- Country: Poland
- Voivodeship: Podlaskie
- County: Mońki
- Gmina: Jaświły
- Time zone: UTC+1 (CET)
  - Summer (DST): UTC+2 (CEST)
- Vehicle registration: BMN
- Website: http://www.jaswily.pl

Jaświły [jaɕˈfiwɨ] is a village in Mońki County, Podlaskie Voivodeship, in north-eastern Poland. It is the seat of the gmina (administrative district) called Gmina Jaświły.

== History ==
Following the German-Soviet invasion of Poland, which started World War II in September 1939, the village was initially occupied by the Soviet Union until 1941, and then by Germany until 1944. Afterwards, it was restored to Poland, although with a Soviet-installed communist regime, which stayed in power until the Fall of Communism in the 1980s. The Polish anti-communist resistance was active in Jaświły, and in 1945 it raided a local communist police station.
