= Ołdaki, Pułtusk County =

Ołdaki
- Village
- Location within Poland
- Coordinates: 52°43′39″N 20°54′51″E
- Country: Poland
- Voivodeship: Masovian
- County: Pułtusk
- Gmina: Gzy

Ołdaki [ɔu̯ˈdaki] is a village in the administrative district of Gmina Gzy, within Pułtusk County, Masovian Voivodeship, in east-central Poland.
