= Mońki County =

Mońki County Powiat moniecki
- County
- Flag Coat of arms

- Location within the voivodeship
- Coordinates (Mońki): 53°24′N 22°48′E
- Country: Poland
- Voivodeship: Podlaskie
- Seat: Mońki
- Gminas: Total 7: Gmina Goniądz; Gmina Jasionówka; Gmina Jaświły; Gmina Knyszyn; Gmina Krypno; Gmina Mońki; Gmina Trzcianne

Area
  - Total: 1,382.39 km^{2} (533.74 sq mi)

Population (2019)
  - Total: 40,518
  - Density: 29.310/km^{2} (75.913/sq mi)
  - Urban: 14,548
  - Rural: 25,970
- Car plates: BMN
- Website: www.monki.pl

Mońki County (Polish: powiat moniecki) is a unit of territorial administration and local government (powiat) in Podlaskie Voivodeship, northeastern Poland. It came into being on January 1, 1999, as a result of the Polish local government reforms passed in 1998. Its administrative seat and largest town is Mońki, which lies 40 kilometres (25 mi) northwest of the regional capital Białystok. The county also contains the towns of Knyszyn, lying 13 km (8 mi) southeast of Mońki, and Goniądz, 11 km (7 mi) northwest of Mońki.

The county covers an area of 1,382.39 square kilometres (533.7 sq mi). As of 2019 its total population is 40,518, out of which the population of Mońki is 9,986, that of Knyszyn is 2,748, that of Goniądz is 1,814, and the rural population is 25,970.

Mońki County existed also between 1954 - 1975, but it was deleted after reform.

== Neighbouring counties ==
Mońki County is bordered by Augustów County to the north, Sokółka County to the east, Białystok County to the south, Łomża County to the west and Grajewo County to the north-west.

== Administrative divisions ==
The county is subdivided into seven gminas (three urban-rural and four rural). These are listed in the following table, in descending order of population.

Gmina	Type	Area (km^{2})	Population (2019)	Seat
Gmina Mońki	urban-rural	161.6	14,883	Mońki
Gmina Jaświły	rural	175.4	4,919	Jaświły
Gmina Goniądz	urban-rural	376.7	4,903	Goniądz
Gmina Knyszyn	urban-rural	127.7	4,770	Knyszyn
Gmina Trzcianne	rural	331.6	4,288	Trzcianne
Gmina Krypno	rural	112.7	3,989	Krypno
Gmina Jasionówka	rural	96.7	2,766	Jasionówka
