= Carska Droga =

Road in the Podlaskie Voivodeship, Poland

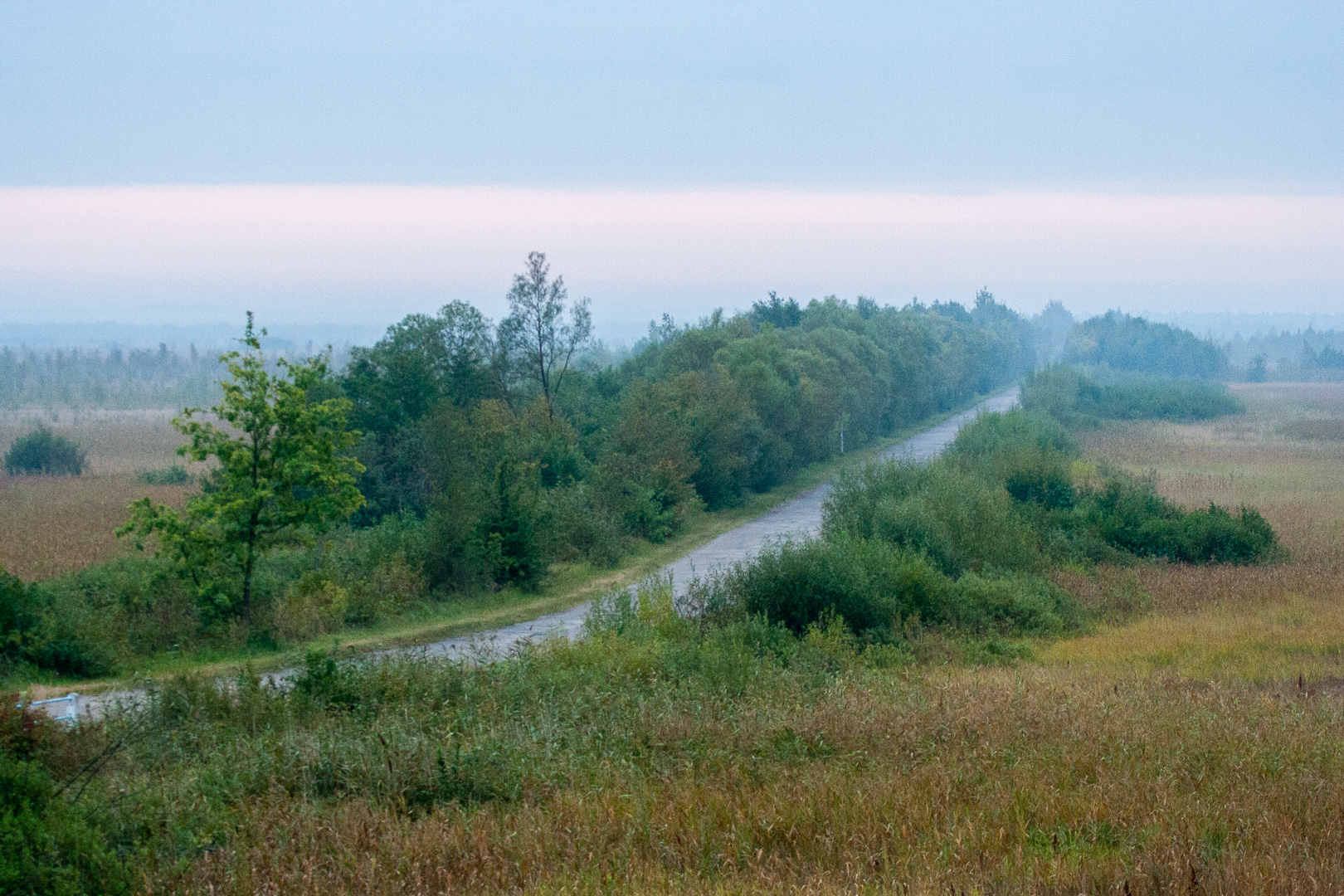
Carska Droga crossing Ławki swamp, view from the observation tower in the early morning

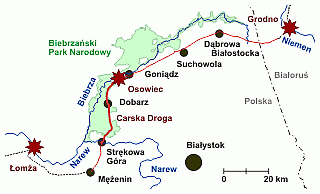
Road connecting the Russian fortresses of Grodno, Osowiec, and Łomża from the Partition era. It was part of a defensive line stretching along the rivers Neman–Biebrza–Narew–Vistula–Wieprz. A red line marks the segment sometimes labeled on maps as Carska Droga, while a bold line highlights the section passing through areas such as the marshes of Biebrza National Park

Carska Droga (English: Imperial Road, also known as Carski Trakt [Imperial Route] or Carska Szosa [Imperial Highway]) is a road in the Podlaskie Voivodeship, starting in Mężenin and then running north and northeast through Strękowa Góra, Osowiec, Goniądz, Dąbrowa Białostocka to the state border, and further to Grodno in Belarus. The road was constructed at the turn of the 19th and 20th centuries to connect the imperial fortresses of Łomża, Osowiec, and Grodno, serving as a lateral route.

However, the term "Carska Droga" is more commonly used in a narrower sense, referring to a 33-kilometer section from the Narew river bridge in Strękowa Góra to the intersection with National Road No. 65 in Osowiec-Twierdza.

This section largely traverses the Biebrza National Park or runs along its boundary, passing through embankments amid inaccessible marshes and dunes. It is well known for frequent encounters with moose.

== Scope of the name "Carska Droga" ==
Nature enthusiasts typically use or narrow the term Carska Droga to refer to the 33-kilometer section from the Narew river bridge in Strękowa Góra to the intersection with National Road No. 65 in the village of Osowiec-Twierdza. It is important not to confuse the nearby Narew-side villages of Strękowa Góra and Góra Strękowa. From Dobarz to Strękowa Góra, for a stretch of several kilometers, the road does not run along post-glacial dunes but along an embankment built through marshes – a construction feat that required significant funding, potentially earning it the name Carska Droga.

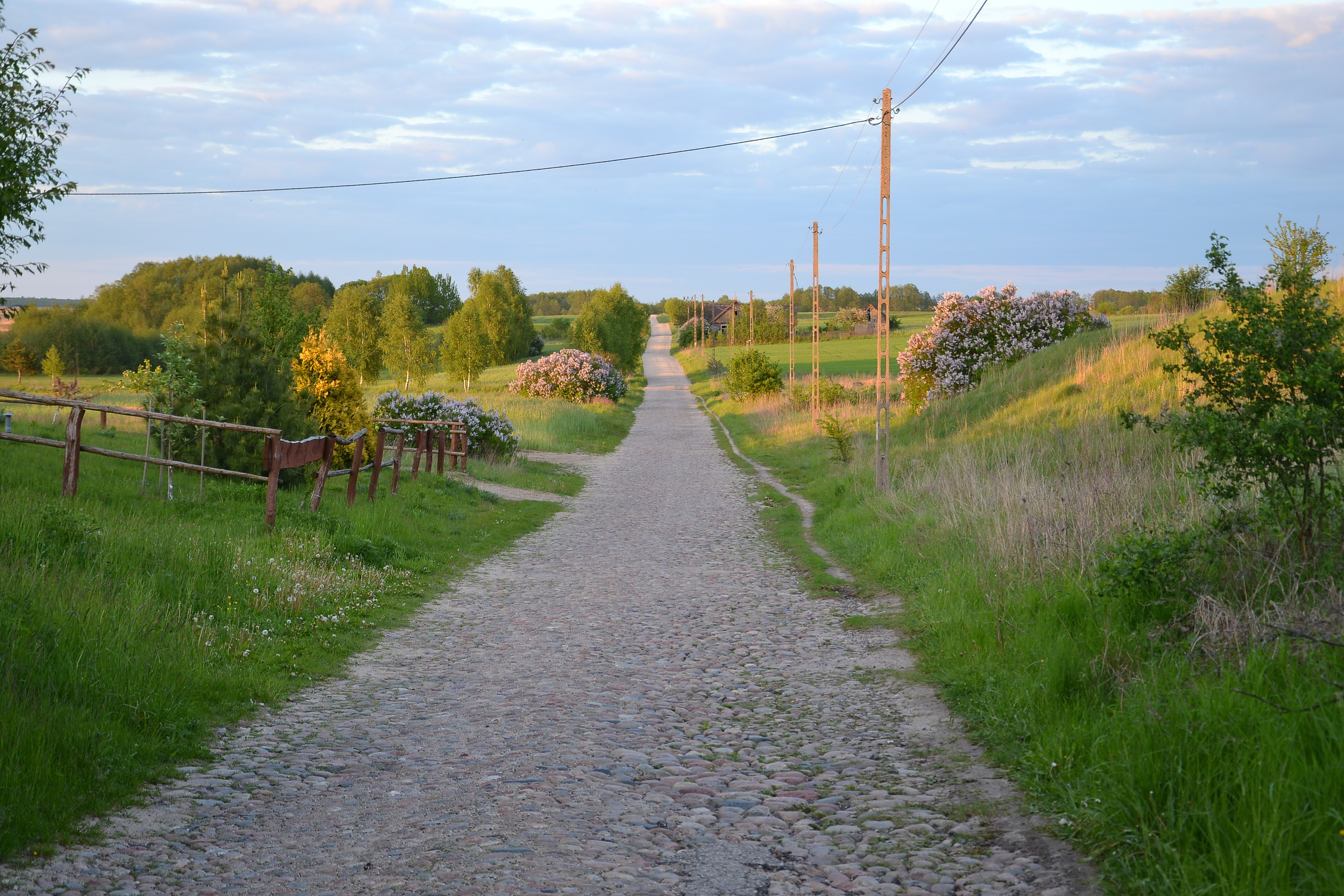
Carska Droga in Goniądz

Fortification researchers, however, use the term to describe a much longer road network connecting the fortresses of Łomża, Osowiec, and Grodno. In this broader sense, Carska Droga begins as early as Mężenin (or even Łomża, according to some sources) and runs north and northeast through Strękowa Góra, Osowiec, Goniądz, and Dąbrowa Białostocka to the state border, continuing to Grodno in Belarus. Maps of the Biebrza valley and Biebrza National Park label this entire route from Mężenin (before its intersection with National Road No. 64 near Strękowa Góra) to near the state border (past Dąbrowa Białostocka) as Carska Droga.

Historically, Carska Droga was originally known as Droga Łomżyńska. According to some sources, this name referred to the entire segment connecting all three fortresses (Grodno, Osowiec, and Łomża). However, researcher Bogusław Perzyk limits it to the road linking Osowiec Fortress with Łomża, which local residents called Carska Droga. Similarly, Sergey Khmelkov's writings refer to the road heading south from Osowiec Fortress as Droga Łomżyńska (Russian: Ломжинское шоссе), while the route heading northeast, bombed during the day by German forces, is called the road to Grodno (Russian: шоссе на Гродно).

Some argue that the name Carski Trakt was also created for marketing purposes.

Part of this broader understanding of Carska Droga includes District Road No. 1838B – a 34.466-kilometer section between the intersection with National Road No. 64 (Strękowa Góra) and the intersection with National Road No. 65 (Osowiec). This section includes the aforementioned 33-kilometer fragment located in Mońki County, beginning slightly farther on the county boundary at the Narew river in Strękowa Góra.

== History ==
=== Construction ===
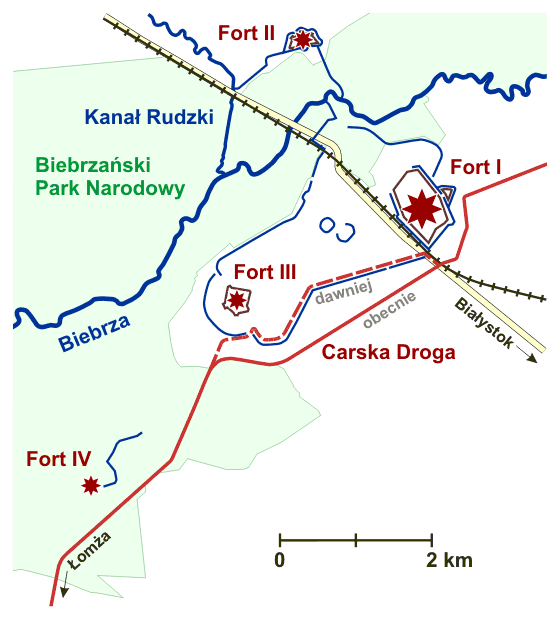
Originally, Carska Droga ran along the inner side of the moat of Osowiec Fortress (depicted by a dashed red line), a layout that was altered after 1953 (depicted by a solid line)

In its broader definition, Carska Droga was built at the end of the 19th century to support the Osowiec Fortress and the system of fortifications along the western border of the Russian Empire as a military lateral road. Its primary role was to ensure communication between the Russian fortresses of Grodno, Osowiec, and Łomża. It also facilitated the movement of troops between the forts and resistance points within the Osowiec Fortress itself. Built between 1882 and 1892, the Osowiec Fortress, which was never captured, was strategically located in an area where the Biebrza Marshes could be crossed.

Carska Droga was constructed parallel to the left bank of the Biebrza river, running through marshes and sandy dunes. The decision to build this strategic military road through the marshes was personally decreed by Tsar Nicholas II. An anecdote suggests it was constructed along a line drawn by the tsar using a ruler between Grodno and Warsaw. In any case, it was built with long straight sections, which made construction in the marshy terrain challenging.

Building the road, especially the section from Dobarz to Strękowa Góra, where it runs through marshes on an embankment, posed significant challenges and incurred enormous costs. The construction process involved first surveying the route, removing peat, laying fascines, and covering them with gravel mixed with crushed stone using steam-powered machines.

Exiled people were not employed in the construction. Instead, local residents were hired for the work under public assistance programs. The poor inhabitants of the marshes who participated in the construction recalled this period as one of unusual prosperity. There were also scandals – several officials who inflated the amount of earth used to build the roadbed were hanged as an example. The road was not constructed for the benefit of the local population. The military nature of the road was made clear by the response from the tsarist authorities to a complaint from the mayor of a bypassed village, Trzcianne: "This is a military road, and it is none of your concern".

Initially known as Droga Łomżyńska, Carska Droga was constructed in 1895 or between 1895 and 1907. Originally, the road had a cobblestone and gravel surface, but today, most of it is paved with asphalt.

=== Usage ===
Carska Droga was used by the Tsarist army during the defense of Osowiec Fortress at the beginning of World War I. In September 1939, Polish soldiers marched along this road from Osowiec to the Wizna sector, whose defense became one of the most heroic episodes of World War II. After World War II, the road lost its military character and became a local communication route. The cobblestone road also allowed access to the Biebrza meadows for their owners.

== Length ==
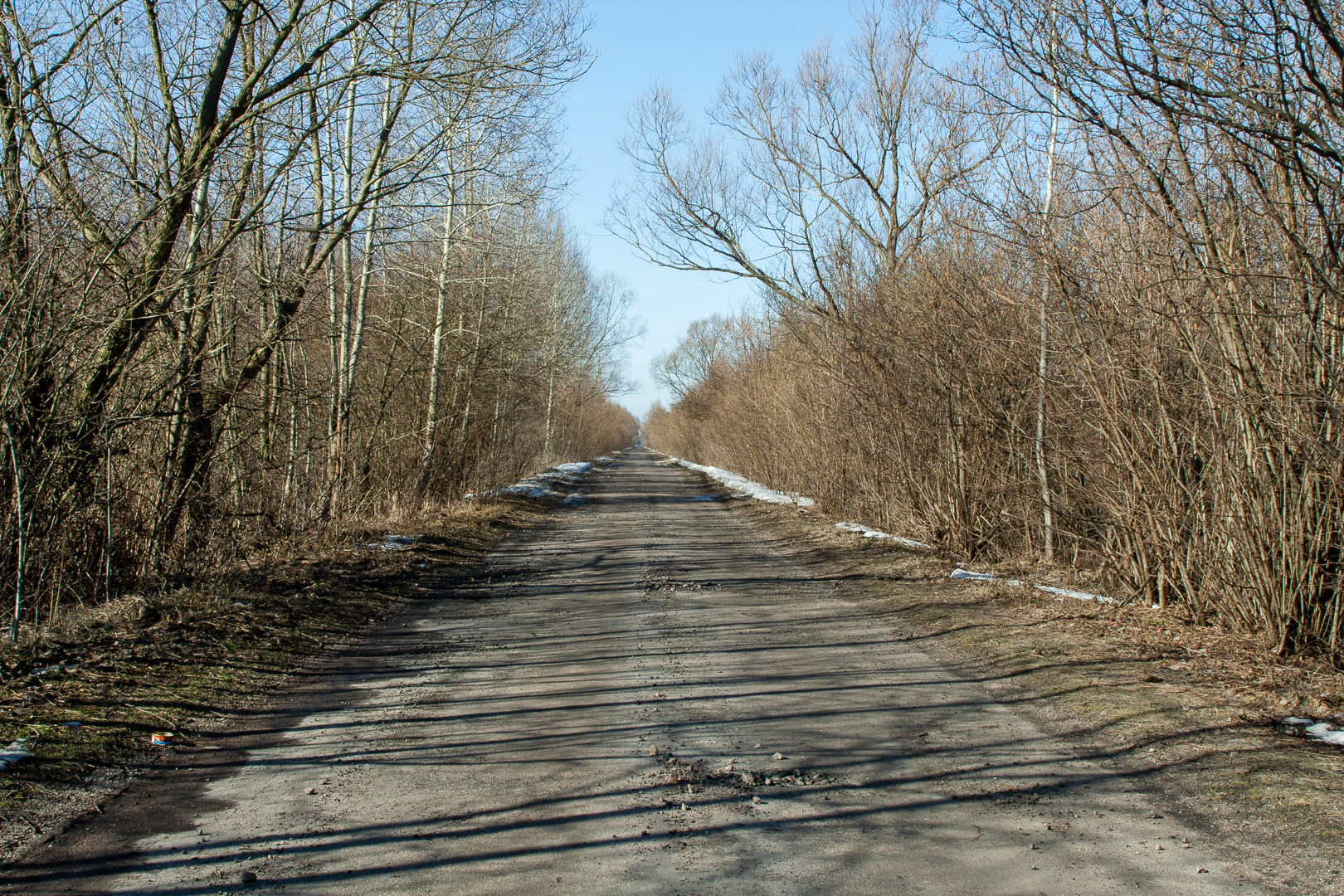
Typical long, straight section of Carska Droga

The lengths of individual sections measured in Google Earth are as follows:

Section	Length
Mężenin – Strękowa Góra	14.0 km
Strękowa Góra – Osowiec Fortress including: – from Narew in Strękowa Góra – in Biebrza National Park	34.4 km 33.0 km 23.8 km
Osowiec Fortress – Dąbrowa Białostocka	51.0 km
Dąbrowa Białostocka – state border	19.7 km
State border – Grodno	approx. 9 km

Total length is approximately 128 km, with 119.1 km within the country's borders. Most of the section from Strękowa Góra to Osowiec Fortress runs within or along the boundary of the national park – a total of 23.8 km.

Originally, Droga Łomżyńska from Łomża to Grodno (including the additional section from Mężenin to Łomża) was 169 km long.

== Tourist attractions ==
The most interesting section in terms of nature and landscape is from Narew river in Strękowa Góra to Osowiec Fortress, which includes:

- A section of the Podlachia Stork Trail along this road.

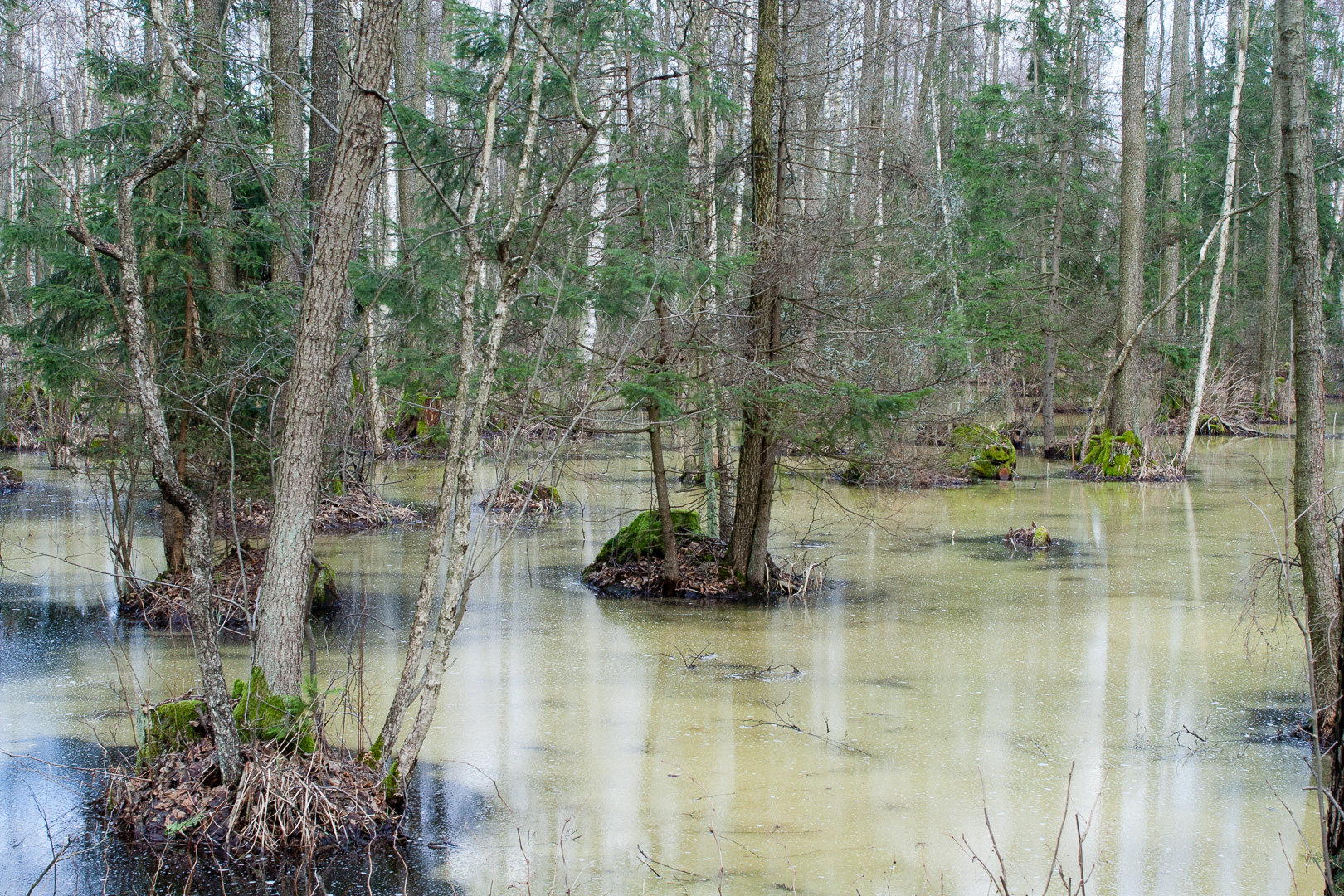
Alder carrs along Carska Droga in early spring

From south to north:

- The "Brama na Bagna" Ecological Education Center in Strękowa Góra.
- Flooded meadows on both sides of the embankment where the road runs, still within the park's buffer zone, a place for observing rare bird species.
- The alder carrs in the strict protection area of the Biebrza National Park, including a nesting and occurrence site for rare bird species.
- Ławki swamp – open areas. A bridge helps observe the aquatic warbler, and there is a viewing tower. Near the tower, the annual Biebrza Haymaking Championships take place in early September, aiming to promote active conservation of overgrown open areas.
- Honczarowska Embankment, perpendicular to Carska Droga; a nature trail runs along it. There is a tower, from which one can view Batalionowa Meadow on the Ławki swamp, where mowing has been restored.
- Access to the village of Gugny and the Gugny–Budy trail, the Field Station of the Biology Institute in Białystok, private accommodations.
- Gugny–Dobarz tourist trail.
- The Dwór Dobarz inn, featuring traditional wooden architecture. The village of Dobarz was once surrounded by the Dobarz Forest.
- A trail to the village of Budy. Koniks and Polish Red cows, which help prevent the overgrowth of the marsh meadows, can be observed there.
- Ruins of Fort IV of the Osowiec Fortress – a nature-history trail.
- A viewing platform over a peat bog with cottongrass and round-leaved sundews.
- Osowiec Fortress – guided tours only, organized by the Osowiec Fortifications Society.
- A viewing tower near the Ruda Canal, quite a distance from Carska Droga, located along national road No. 65 on the opposite side of the Osowiec Fortress and Biebrza river.

== Nature ==
=== Strękowa Góra–Osowiec Fortress ===
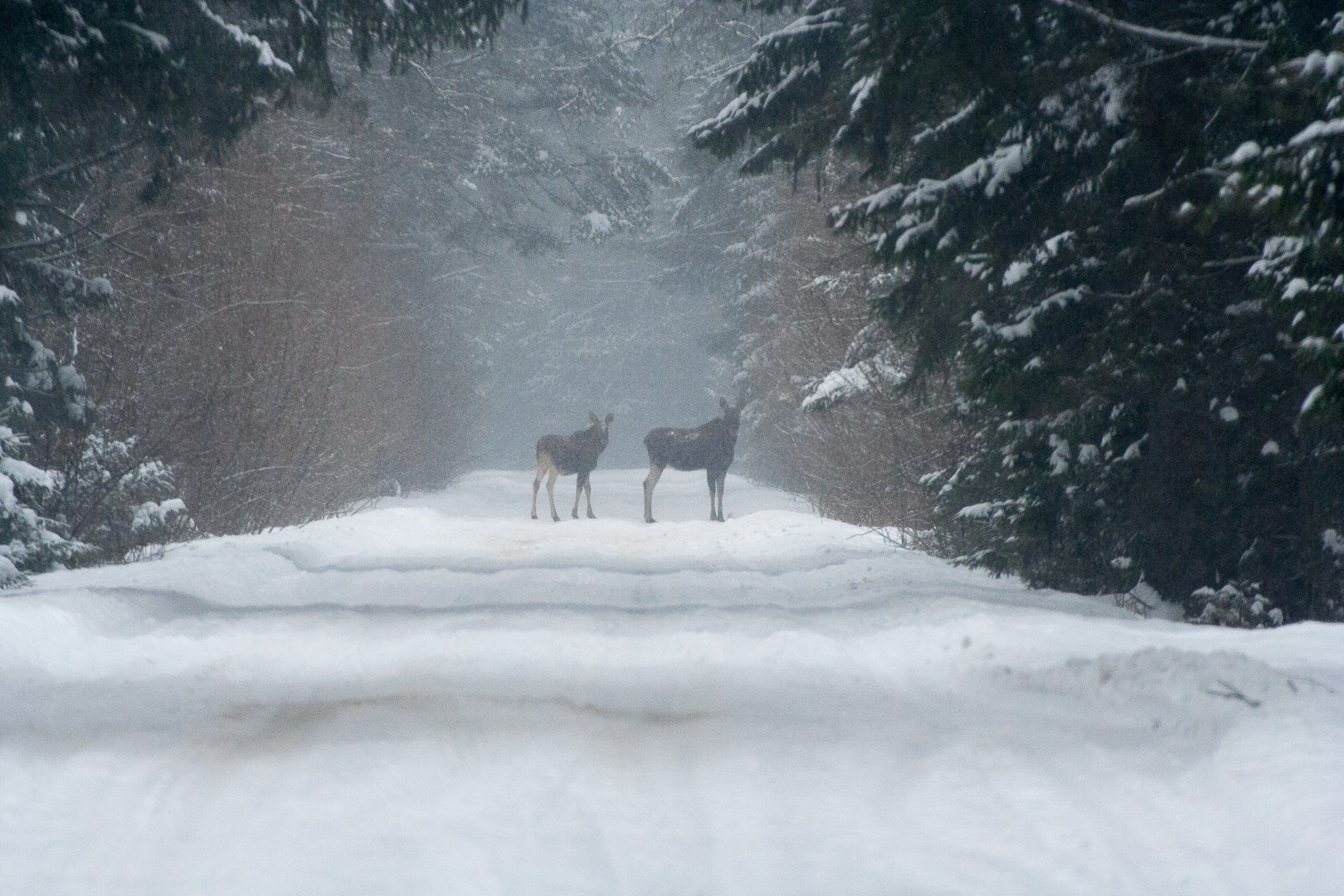
Moose and calf on Carska Droga near Osowiec Fortress during heavy snowfall

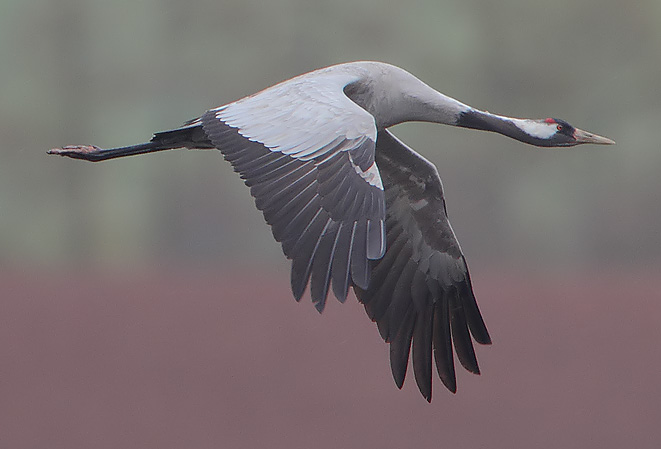
Common crane

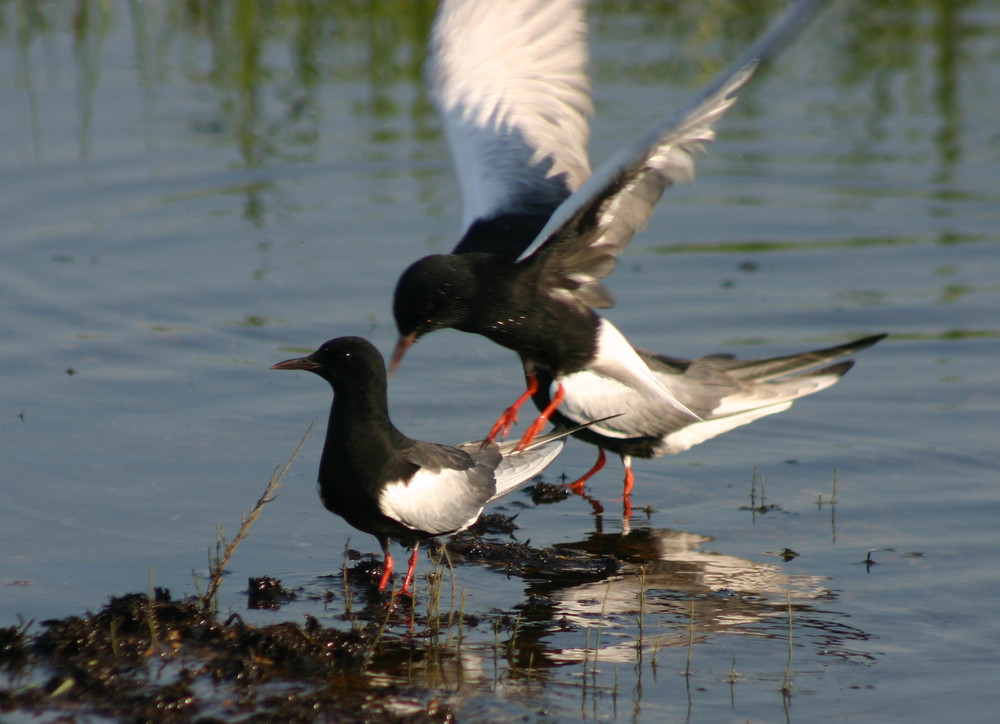
White-winged tern

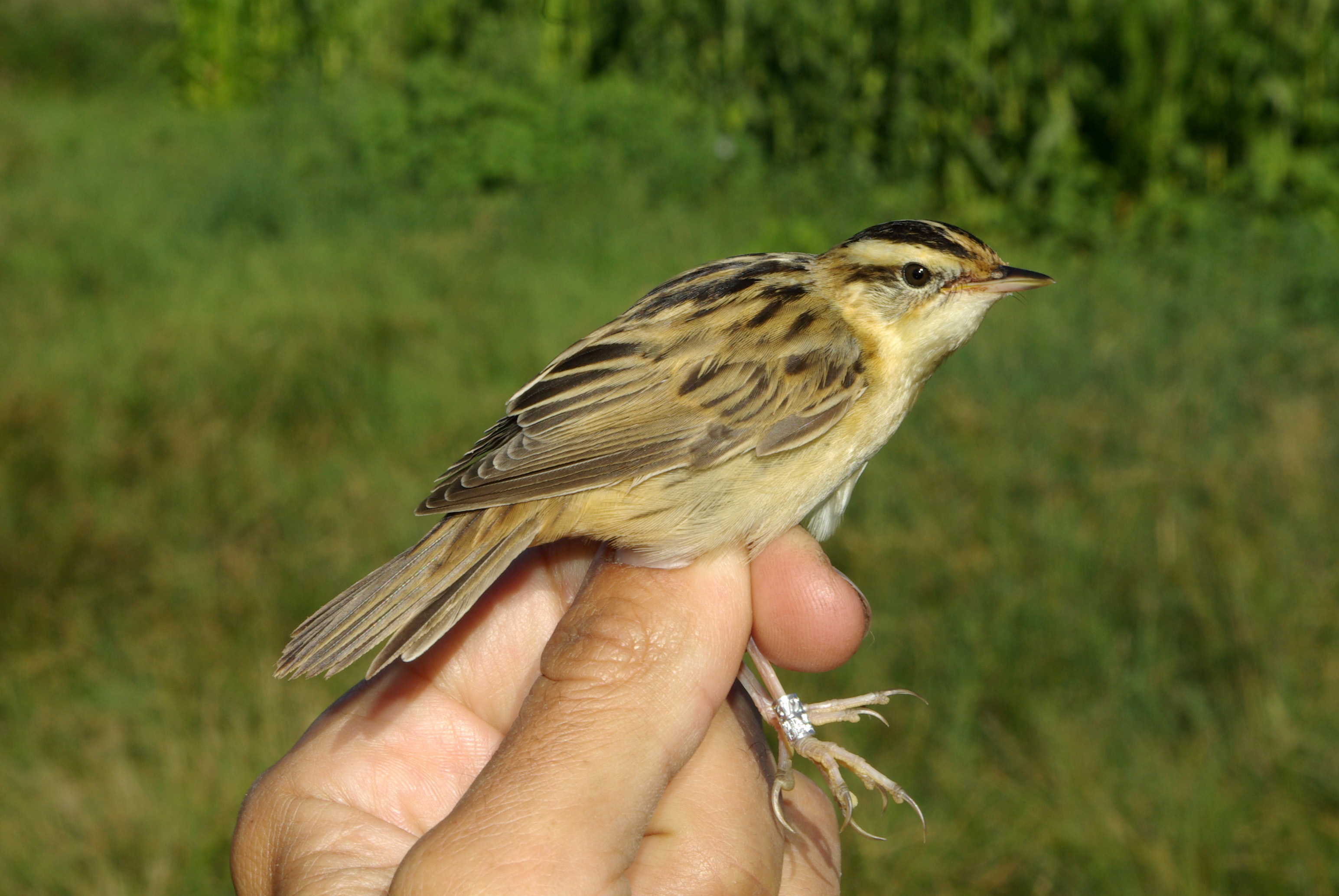
Aquatic warbler

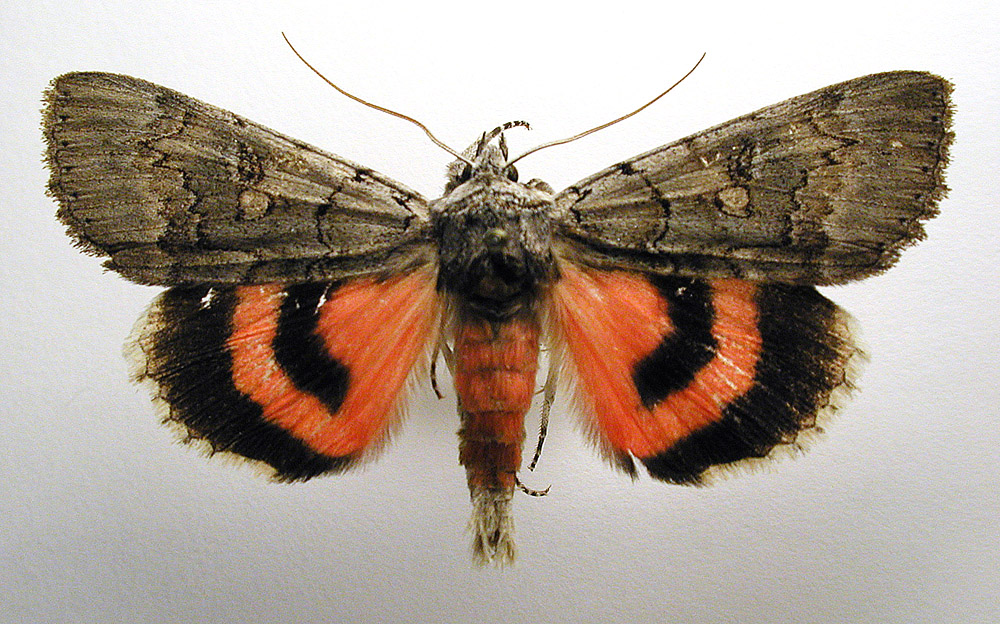
Catocala pacta

Carska Droga in this section, which is county road No. 1838B with a total length of 34.466 km, runs almost entirely through the Biebrza National Park. It passes about 33 km of its buffer zone, including approximately 20 km within the park itself (including a 3.6 km stretch through the strict protection area of the park – an alder carr with a high degree of naturalness) and about 4.5 km along its boundary. Since 1995, the national park has been listed as a Ramsar Convention protected area (RS#756).

Recently, this section has also been included in European protected areas – the Natura 2000 Special Area of Conservation "Dolina Biebrzy" (PLH 20008) and the Natura 2000 Special Protection Area "Ostoja Biebrzańska" (PLB 20006). Their boundaries align with the park's buffer zone.

Carska Droga within the park's buffer zone is attractive for its natural qualities due to the absence of buildings, billboards, human presence, minimal tourist traffic and signage, and a variety of landscapes. The deteriorated asphalt surface of the still-unrepaired road prevents excessive speeds. It attracts a large number of nature enthusiasts and birdwatchers. Moose are frequently seen here, and wolves can also be spotted, along with rare bird species. Osowiec Fortress is one of the largest bat wintering sites in Poland.

In the areas of the Biebrza National Park directly adjacent to Carska Droga, near Ławki swamp, birds of prey such as the greater spotted eagle, Eurasian eagle-owl, black stork, common crane, bluethroat, white-backed woodpecker, Eurasian curlew, Montagu's harrier, hen harrier, black-tailed godwit, common redshank, and short-eared owl are common. There are also lekking sites and nesting areas for the great snipe and the black grouse, the largest known site for the aquatic warbler in Poland, and territories of the greater spotted eagle, black stork, and white-backed woodpecker. In 2006, a northern hawk-owl stayed at Ławki swamp for over a month, attracting numerous birdwatchers. During the spring flooding of the meadows along the embankment south of the park, white-winged terns, ruffs, and various duck species can be observed.

Many rare and protected species of moths, especially nocturnal ones, can be found near the road, including Catocala pacta (the only place in Poland where it occurs). Other moth species include the clouded Apollo, scarce heath, large chequered skipper, and Diachrysia zosimi.

There are 127 algae taxa found in the shallow roadside ditches, including 4 new to science and 7 (or 11) new to Poland.

Carska Droga passes through several Natura 2000 habitats – coniferous swamps (code 91D0-2), Cladonia variant of the coniferous swamp (code 91T0), raised bogs with high-moor moss (codes 7101, 7120), alkaline peat bogs, and meadows (code 7230), as well as a natural alder carrs in the strict protection zone along the southern border of the Biebrza National Park.

=== Mężenin–Strękowa Góra ===
County road No. 1973B, the section from Mężenin to National Road No. 64 (just before Strękowa Góra), with a total length of 14.075 km, runs for approximately 3.6 km within the planned Natura 2000 bird protection area "Bagno Wizna" (PLB 20005).

== Impact on the Biebrza Marshes' natural environment ==
From an environmental perspective, transforming Carska Droga into a transit route would be harmful to the Biebrza Marshes, which was blocked by nature enthusiasts. However, in late 2013, road resurfacing began as the road holds some local importance. This may lead to an increase in vehicle traffic and the risk of accidents.

Carska Droga acts as a hydrological barrier, limiting the flow of water from the eastern to the western part of the Ławki swamp in Biebrza National Park. Its embankment has caused the groundwater table to rise in the east, leading to the development of mossy areas.

The road also intersects animal migration routes, causing isolation of habitats.

It is also responsible for collisions between vehicles and various species of animals: mammals (e.g., beaver, squirrel, fox, brown hare, mole), birds (e.g., common blackbird, song thrush, tawny owl, great spotted woodpecker, European nightjar), and reptiles (grass snake). However, amphibians are the main victims among vertebrates (93.1% of casualties in a 2014 study). A scientific report commissioned by Biebrza National Park revealed that tens of thousands of animal crossings occur annually. During three inspections carried out in the spring, summer, and autumn of 2014, nearly 5,300 dead vertebrates were documented as being killed by vehicles.

== Renovation of Carska Droga ==
In November 2013, renovation began on the 33 km stretch of Carska Droga from the Mońki County border (Strękowa Góra) to National Road No. 65 (Białystok–Ełk), which was in a severely deteriorated condition. The work continued throughout 2014, except during the bird nesting season.

The project involved clearing the road surface, leveling it, and applying a structural layer and a 4 cm thick asphalt-mineral mixture wearing layer.

This renovation was part of the project "Providing Access to Tourism- and Economically Valuable Areas – Improving the Quality of Roads in the Polish-Belarusian Border Region", funded through the Poland-Belarus-Ukraine Cross-Border Cooperation Program 2007–2013. It also included upgrading the Grodno–Sapotskin road in Belarus. A total of €3.8 million was secured from the European Union for this initiative, with approximately €2 million allocated to Mońki County. The funding covered 89.5% of the project's total cost.

The renovation proceeded without an environmental impact assessment, which had been demanded by ecologists. However, such an assessment was not legally required for a road repair project.
