= Anna Wasilewska (farmer) =

Polish farmer

- Born: circa 1894
- Died: August 16, 1945; Zucielec, Poland
- Cause of death: execution by shooting
- Citizenship: Polish
- Occupation: farmer
- Spouse: Jan Wasilewski
- Children: Stanisław, Kazimierz, Jerzy
- Honours: Righteous Among the Nations

Anna Wasilewska (born circa 1894, died 16 August 1945 in Zucielec) was a Polish farmer and resident of the village of Zucielec, near Trzcianne. She, along with her husband and sons, was honored with the Righteous Among the Nations medal. She was murdered, likely by members of the anti-communist underground, shortly after the end of World War II.

== Biography ==
=== Hiding Jews ===
Anna Wasilewska grew up in poverty and without parents. During World War II, together with her husband Jan and their sons Stanisław, Kazimierz, and Jerzy, she ran a farm in the village of Zucielec near Trzcianne.

In 1942, when the German occupiers began liquidating the ghettos in the Białystok District, she and her husband agreed to shelter Jewish escapees. At that time, she was about 48 years old.

Initially, the Wasilewski family took in the Kijak family, consisting of five people. However, due to the difficulty of providing food for such a large group, the Kijak family eventually moved to another Polish family. Shortly thereafter, the Wasilewski family provided refuge for brothers Zvi (Note: Appearing in some sources under the name Hirsz (Konopa (2016, p. 10)).) and Dawid Mroczkowski (whom Jan knew through their father and grandfather), as well as Marja (Maśka) Fiszko. (Note: This surname was provided by Kazimierz Wasilewski, while according to his brother Stanisław, the girl’s surname was Szpak (Konopa (2016, p. 10)).) All of them had escaped from the ghetto in Trzcianne. The three Jews hid with the Wasilewski family for nearly two years. At first, they stayed in the hosts’ home. Later, hiding places were arranged for them in the attic, where hay was stored, and in an underground dugout beneath the cowshed. The family sheltered the Jews selflessly. In testimony given after the war to Yad Vashem, Zvi Mroczkowski emphasized the kindness that the Wasilewski family showed him and his brother every day.

Over time, the fact that the Wasilewski family was hiding Jews became known to local residents. One of the neighbors informed the Ordnungspolizei. However, they were saved by a distant relative working at the local Gendarmerie post as an interpreter, who managed to convince the Germans that the informer had come to the post to ask permission to slaughter a pig. At another point, partisans reportedly arrived at the farm demanding that the Jews be handed over, but Anna firmly refused.

The three Jews remained hidden with the Wasilewski family until the arrival of the Red Army. Shortly after, the Mroczkowski brothers moved to Knyszyn (in another version of events, to Białystok) before eventually emigrating to Israel. Dawid likely died during the Six-Day War, while Zvi maintained written contact with the Wasilewski family until the mid-1990s. Meanwhile, 21-year-old Maśka Fiszko returned to Trzcianne and lived in one of the rooms in her family home, which had been taken over by a Polish family during the occupation. She did not demand the return of the property. However, not long after, while returning from a visit to the Wasilewski family, she was abducted and murdered by local Poles.

=== Death ===
On 18 April 1945, armed attackers stormed the Wasilewski household. Kazimierz Wasilewski later described them as a "gang" or "partisans". Anna and her sons were beaten, and their farm was thoroughly looted. According to Kazimierz's account, the assailants were searching for gold or money, which they believed the family must have received from the Jews they had hidden. They also declared that the attack and beating were a "punishment" for sheltering Jews.

Anna Wasilewska recognized the attackers. According to her sons' testimony, she approached Father Stanisław Mikulski – the Catholic parson in Trzcianne at the time, considered the informal leader of the "partisans" (Note: He was probably associated with the Home Army and later with the anti-communist underground (Sychowicz (2005, p. 128)). Before the war, he was known for his anti-Semitic views (Tryczyk (2020, p. 115)).) – asking for help in recovering the stolen horses. Additionally, according to the accounts of Trzcianne residents, referenced by Mirosław Tryczyk in his book, Anna allegedly identified one of the attackers during a mass when he appeared in church wearing a shirt stolen from her deceased husband. She publicly accused him of the attack and threatened to report the incident to the Security Office if the stolen horses were not returned.

Fearing another attack, the Wasilewski family began sleeping outside their home for a time, but this did not prevent the ensuing tragedy. On 16 August 1945, the same group of "partisans" attacked the household again, raping and shooting Anna in front of her sons. According to the Wasilewski brothers, Father Mikulski refused to give her a Catholic funeral, supposedly as punishment for identifying the attackers after the first assault. (Note: According to Kazimierz Wasilewski, the clergyman allegedly said, "You shouldn't have gotten to know them" (Konopa (2016, p. 19)).) Ultimately, under pressure from her extended family, he agreed to bless the coffin, but did not allow it to be brought into the church nor accompanied it to the cemetery.

On 31 May 1988, Anna Wasilewska was posthumously awarded the Righteous Among the Nations medal. The same honor was bestowed upon her husband and three sons.

== Bibliography ==
- Konopa, Łukasz (2016). "Trzcianne – studium przypadku. Wojna polsko-polska o Żydów w relacjach świadków" [Trzcianne – A Case Study. The Polish-Polish War over Jews in the Accounts of Witnesses]. Studia Litteraria et Historica (in Polish). 5. ISSN 2299-7571.
- Sychowicz, Krzysztof (2005). "Kościół katolicki w województwie białostockim wobec podziemia antykomunistycznego w latach 1945–1953" [The Catholic Church in the Białystok Voivodeship and the Anti-Communist Underground in 1945–1953]. Pamięć i Sprawiedliwość (in Polish). 4 (8). ISSN 1427-7476.
- Tryczyk, Mirosław (2020). Drzazga. Kłamstwa silniejsze niż śmierć [Splinter: Lies Stronger Than Death] (in Polish). Kraków: Znak. ISBN 978-83-240-4876-2.
