= Małgorzata Górska =

Polish activist and conservationist

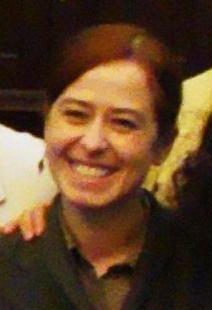
- Occupation: environmentalist
- Organization: Polish Society for the Protection of Birds (OTOP)
- Known for: preserving the Rospuda Valley
- Awards: Goldman Environmental Prize (2010), "Best of Bests" title (2011), "Polish Birds Republic Ambassador" title (2011)

Małgorzata Górska is a Polish activist and conservationist, who played an integral role in the movement to protect the Rospuda Valley in north-eastern Poland, one of Europe's last true wilderness areas. She comes from Trzcianne region in Podlaskie Voivodship in Poland.

== Biography ==
Małgorzata Górska works for Polish Society for the Protection of Birds. Since 2002 she has been running a campaign for changing the planned route of the Via Baltica Expressway in order to preserve the Rospuda Valley. In 2010 she won the Goldman Environmental Prize for her achievements as the second Pole in history, after Jadwiga Łopata winning the Prize in 2002. Beside this, together with her husband they run an ecotourism household in the Biebrza Valley.

== Contribution to preserving the Rospuda Valley ==
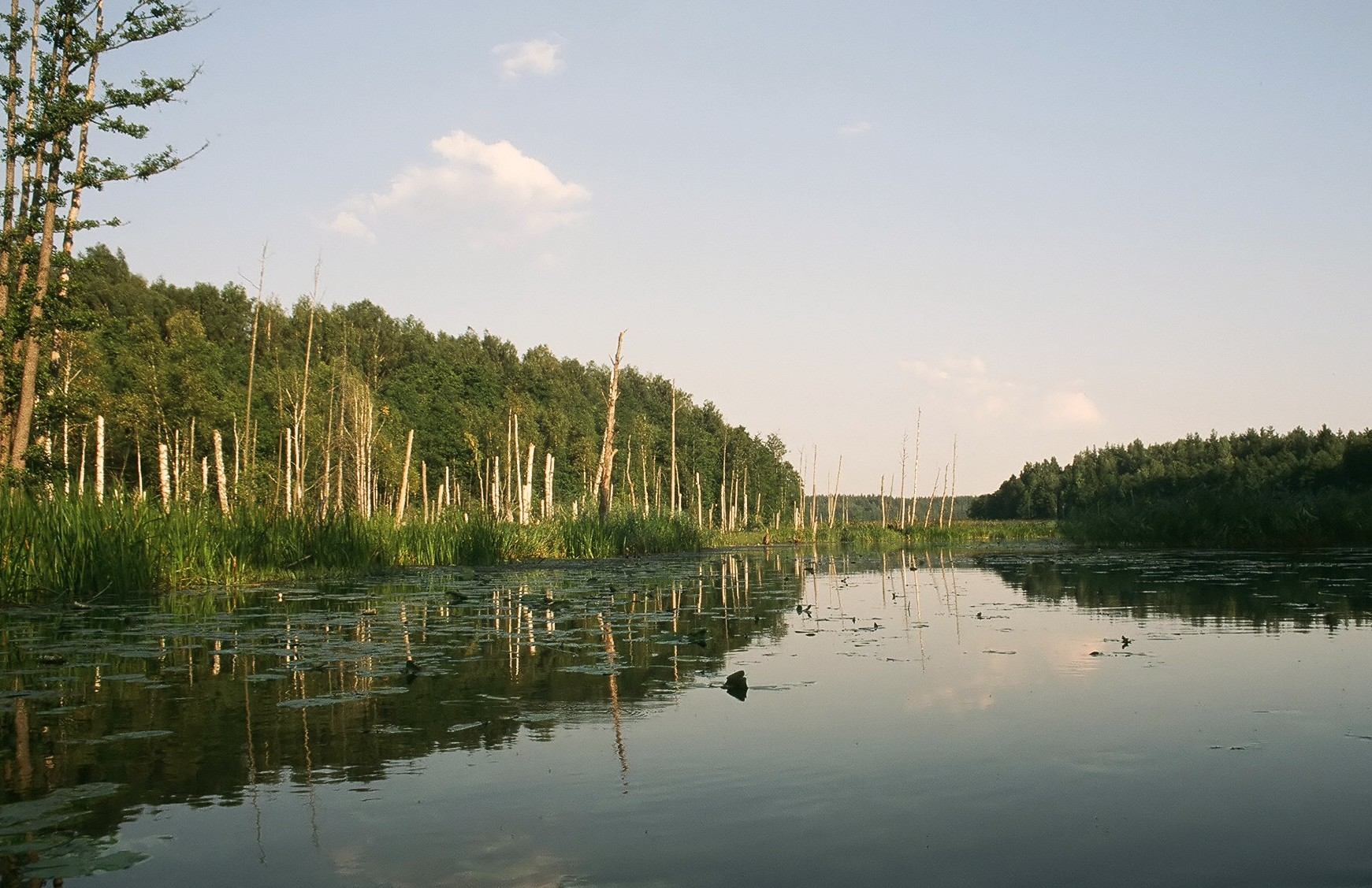
The Rospuda Valley, in the north eastern Poland, is one of Europe’s last undisturbed wildernesses, recognized widely for its beauty and environmental significance. It is home to endangered eagles and other bird species, orchids, lynxes, wolves, elk, wild boars, otters and beavers.

When the plans of building Via Baltica Expressway through the unique and unspoilt areas of Rospuda Valley was established, Małgorzata Górska started her campaign in order to urge the politicians to change the plans. In 2002 she galvanized a coalition of activists and organizations, including WWF Poland, Greenpeace, the Polish Green Network and the Polish Society for Protection of Birds. She was a co-organizer of the public movement, during which people wore a green ribbon to show support for her ideas. Małgorzata Górska was active in the media, she gave interviews and took part in numerous debates. Her activities were often a topic for magazine and newspaper articles.

When Poland joined the European Union in 2004, the Rospuda Valley became a protected area thanks to the Natura 2000 programme. However, her negotiations with the Polish government still did not bring the desired outcomes. In 2007 the European Commission transferred the case to the Court of Justice of the European Union. At last, the European Parliament prepared a report on the topic. At the same time, Polish courts announced on three occasions that the planned route is not compatible with Polish Law.

After eight years of fighting, in March 2009, the Polish government declared that the route would be changed and would not intersect with the Rospuda Valley. Despite the original aim having been achieved, Małgorzata Górska did not stop there. A change of route was needed so as not to intrude on the protected areas of Knyszyn Primeval Forest, the Biebrza Marshes and the Augustów Primeval Forest. Eventually, on 20 October 2009 a rerouting was planned for these controversial route sections and these terrains were saved from destruction.

== Application to the Goldman Environmental Prize and the ceremony ==
In 2010, Manana Kochladze, who is associated with Bankwatch and is the winner of the 2004 Goldman Environmental Prize, nominated Małgorzata Górska to that year's Prize. The Polish Green Network organization, which is the partner of Bankwatch initiated the application to the Goldman Prize. On winning the Prize, she was invited to the ceremony in San Francisco, but beforehand she attended numerous meetings, one of them with the President of United States Barack Obama.
