= Giełczyn =

Giełczyn may refer to:

- Giełczyn, Masovian Voivodeship (east-central Poland)
- Giełczyn, Łomża County in Podlaskie Voivodeship (north-east Poland)
- Giełczyn, Mońki County in Podlaskie Voivodeship (north-east Poland)
