= Jaroslaw Pelenski =

Polish-born Ukrainian historian (1929–2022)

- Ярослав Богданович Пеленський
- Born: 12 April 1929; Warsaw, Second Polish Republic
- Died: 20 February 2022 (aged 92); New York City, United States
- Occupation: Historian
- Known for: History of Ukraine

Jaroslaw Pelenski (Note: Polish: Jarosław Pełenski; Ukrainian: Ярослав Богданович Пеленський, romanized: Yaroslav Bohdanovych Pelens'kyi. In his English writings, he spelt his own name as "Jaroslaw Pelenski", without Łs.) (Warsaw, 12 April 1929 – New York City, 20 February 2022) was a Polish-born Ukrainian historian, political scientist and professor emeritus. He obtained his higher education in West Germany in the late 1940s and 1950s, and his doctorate in the United States in the 1960s, where he made an academic career. Returning to Ukraine in the 1990s, he was a full member of the Shevchenko Scientific Society, and a foreign member of the National Academy of Sciences of Ukraine, where he served as the Director of the Institute of European Studies of the National Academy of Sciences of Ukraine.

== Biography ==
=== Education in West Germany ===
Pelenski was born to Ukrainian parents in Warsaw in 1929. He grew up in Warsaw and Lublin. When he was 15, his family fled Poland in the summer of 1944, one week before the Warsaw Uprising. After the Second World War, he found himself in the western occupation zones of Germany (which would become West Germany in 1949), attending the Oberrealschule in Würzburg. In 1948, he began studying history at the Julius-Maximilian University in Würzburg, and in 1950–55 he continued his studies at the Ludwig-Maximilians-Universität München. He specialised in the modern history of Europe, and at the same time in the medieval history of Europe, philosophy, and German literature. In 1957, he defended his PhD thesis with distinction on Ukrainian national thought in the light of the works of Mykhailo Hrushevsky and Vyacheslav Lypynsky.

=== Academic education and career in the United States ===
After receiving his PhD, he moved to the United States in 1957, where he was a lecturer in German language and literature at King's College in Wilkes-Barre in Pennsylvania from 1958 until 1961. From 1961–64, he was affiliated with Columbia University in New York, where in 1964, he defended his thesis at the Russian Institute (since 1997 Harriman Institute) titled Soviet Ukrainian Historiography after World War II. From 1964 to 1967 he was an assistant professor in the history department of American University in Washington, D.C. In the spring of 1968 he was a temporary assistant professor in the history department of Columbia University.

In 1968 he defended his dissertation on Muscovite Imperial Claims to the Kazan Khanate: A Case Study in the Emergence of Imperial Ideology and received a second PhD in historical studies with a specialisation in early and modern history of Russia and Eastern Europe. From 1967 to 1971 he was a lecturer at the University of Iowa, from 1971 an associate professor at the university until his retirement in 1998. In 1975 he was a lecturer at the Harvard University summer school. He was the recipient of more than 25 grants and research fellowships (Academic Awards and Post-Doctoral Fellowships), including the Kosciuszko Foundation.

=== Academic career in Ukraine and Poland ===
Pelenski was a member of the editorial board of the journal Kontinent , founded in 1974 and published by the Soviet dissident community in Paris (editor-in-chief Vladimir Maksimov).

In 1984–1987 Pelenski edited, together with Bohdan Osadchuk, the scholarly magazine-almanac Vidnova (Віднова, "Renewal", published in Munich) on current affairs in politics and culture of Ukrainian society; another member of the editorial board was Jerzy Giedroyc. Of the magazine's seven issues, two were devoted to Polish affairs and Ukrainian-Polish relations, while others dealt with: Ukrainian-Russian relations, the centenary of the Ukrainian women's movement, the Chernobyl disaster, and glasnost and perestroika). Thanks to the Vidnova community, a Ukrainian translation of the book Bohdan Skaradziński was published: Byalorusians, Lithuanians, Ukrainians – our enemies or brothers?, devoted to the issue of national minorities and the relationship of Poles with their eastern neighbours. In the summer of 1991, he became a member of the editorial board of the Przegląd Wschodni ("Eastern Review") in Warsaw, and in 1993 a member of the editorial board of the Kyiv-published Ucraina mediaevalis ("Medieval Ukraine").

As early as May 1990, as visiting professor, Pelenski lectured for a month at the Institute of Social Sciences of the Academy of Sciences of the USSR in Lviv. After the Declaration of Independence of Ukraine (24 August 1991), his cooperation with the Ukrainian academic community in the country began. In November 1992, he was elected as a foreign full member (academician) of the National Academy of Sciences of Ukraine (NASU). From 1993 onwards, he was director of the NASU Institute of European Studies. In August 1993, he became a member of the Polish–Ukrainian Historical Commission established by the National Academy of Sciences of Ukraine (NASU) and the Polish Academy of Sciences. Since March 1994, he was a member of the NASU's Office of the History, Philosophy and Law Faculty.

His research interests covered various issues and historical periods: Kievan Rus', Ruthenia and Muscovy, the Russian Tsardom and Empire, Soviet Russia and the Soviet Union since 1917, 20th-century history of Ukraine, and more broadly the modern history of (Eastern) Europe since 1500. He gave lectures, seminars and colloquia on themes such as Leninism, Stalinism, the dissident movement, the Soviet political system, political theory, historiography, problems of nationality, imperialism, communism, nobility, and conservatism.

== Works ==
=== In English ===
1960s

- Pelenski, Jaroslaw (1964). "Soviet Ukrainian Historiography after World War II". Jahrbücher für Geschichte Osteuropas. 12 (3). Franz Steiner Verlag: 375–418. ISSN 0021-4019. JSTOR 41042360. [based on his earlier 1957 PhD thesis]
- Pelenski, Jaroslaw (April 1966). "Recent Ukrainian writing". Soviet Survey (59). New York City: Eastern News Distributors.
- Pelenski, Jaroslaw (1967). "Muscovite Imperial Claims to the Kazan Khanate". Slavic Review. 26 (4). Association for Slavic, East European, and Eurasian Studies: 559–576. doi:10.2307/2492609. ISSN 0037-6779. JSTOR 2492609. [related to his later 1968 PhD thesis]

1970s

- Pelenski, Jaroslaw (31 December 1973). "The Incorporation of the Ukrainian Lands of Old Rus' into Crown Poland (1569) (Socio-material Interest and Ideology – A Reexamination)". American Contributions of the Seventh International Congress of Slavists (Warsaw, August 21-27, 1973). Vol. III: History. The Hague / Paris: De Gruyter. pp. 19–52. doi:10.1515/9783112318553-002. ISBN 978-3-11-231855-3.
- Pelenski, Jaroslaw (1974). Russia and Kazan: Conquest and Imperial Ideology (1438–1560s). Near and Middle East monographs. The Hague/ Paris: Mouton. p. 368. ISBN 978-3-11-194174-5.
- Shelest and his Period in the Soviet Ukraine (1962-1972): A Revival of Controlled Ukrainian Autonomism w: Ukraina in the Seventies Oakville. - Ontario: Mosaic Press, 1975. - pp. 283–305.
- Pelenski, Jaroslaw (1977). "The origins of the official Muscovite claims to the "Kievan inheritance"". Harvard Ukrainian Studies. 1 (1). Harvard Ukrainian Research Institute: 29–52. ISSN 0363-5570. JSTOR 41035738. (copy).
- State and Society in Muscovite Russia and the Mongol-Turkic System in the Sixteenth Century w: A. Ascher, T. H. Halasi-kun, B. Kiraly eds. The Mutual Effects of the Islamic and Judeo-Christian Worlds: The East European Pattern. - New-York: Drooklin College Studies on Society in Change, 1979. - pp. 93–109
- The Sack of Kiev of 1482 in Contemporary Muscovite Chronicle Writing in: Eucharisterion: Essays presented to Omeljan Pritsak w: Harvard Ukrainian Studies. - 1979-1980. - III/IV, 2. - pp. 638–649

1980s

- Russia, Poland and Ukraine: Historical and Political Perspectives w: Poland and Ukraine: Past and Present. - Edmonton-Toronto, 1980. - pp. 308–327
- State and Society in Muscovite Russia and the Mongol-Turkic System in the Sixteenth Century w: Forschungen zur osteuroaischen Geschichte. - 1980. - XXVII. - pp. 156–167
- The American and European Revolutions, 1776-1848: Sociopolitical and Ideological Aspects / Edited with Introduction by Jaroslaw Pelenski / Proceedings of the Secjnd [Bicentennial] Conference of Polish and American Historians, Iowa City, Iowa, U. S. A. (29 September-1 October 1976) / - Iowa City: University of Iowa Press, 1980. - 412 pp.
- Pelenski, Jaroslaw (1982). "The Contest between Lithuania-Rus' and the Golden Horde in the Fourteenth Century for Supremacy over Eastern Europe". Archivum Eurasiae Medii Aevi (PDF). Peter de Ridder Press. pp. 303–320. Reprinted in Pelenski, The Contest for the Legacy of Kievan Rus'.
- The Emergence of the Muscovite Claims to the Byzantine-Kievan "Imperial Inheritance" ("Okeanos": Esseys presented to Ihor Sevcenko) w: Harvard Ukrainian Studies. - 1983-1984. - VII. - pp. 520–531
- State and Society in Europe from the Fifteenth to the Eighteenth Century (Proceedings of the First Conference of Polish and American Historians [1947]) / Edited with introduction by Jaroslaw Pelenski / - Warszawa 1985-86 Warsaw University Press 297 pp.
- Special issue Harvard Ukrainian Studies devoted to "Political and Social Ideas of Vjaceslaw Lypyns'kyj", edited by Jaroslaw Pelenski, Volume IX, Nr 3/4 (December 1985). - Philadelphia: Commemorative Edition, by the W. K. Lypyns'kyj East European Research Institute, Inc., 1987. - 280 pp.
- Pelenski, Jaroslaw (1987). "The Sack of Kiev of 1169: Its Significance for the Succession to Kievan Rus'". Harvard Ukrainian Studies. 11 (3). Harvard Ukrainian Research Institute: 303–316. JSTOR 41036277. Reprinted in Pelenski, The Contest for the Legacy of Kievan Rus'.
- Pelenski, Jaroslaw (1988). "The Contest for the "Kievan Succession" (1155–1175): The Religious-Ecclesiastical Dimension". Harvard Ukrainian Studies. 12/13: 761–780. JSTOR 41036344.
- The Cossack Insurrections in Jewish-Ukrainian Relations in Peter Potychnyj and H. Aster (eds.) Ukrainian-Jewish Relations in Historical Perspective. - Edmonton, 1988. - pp. 31–42.

1990s

- Proceedings of the Commemorative Congress Devoted to the Millennium of the Christianization of Rus'-Ukraine. - Munich, 1990. - 1002 pp.
- The Origins of the Muscovite Ecclesiastical Claims to the "Kievan Inheritance" w: Nuovi studi storici. - 1992. - Vol. 17. - pp. 213–226.
- Potichnyj, Peter J.; Pelenski, Jaroslaw; Raeff, Marc; Thekulin, Gleb, eds. (1992). Ukraine and Russia in Their Historical Encounter. Proceedings of the First Conference on Russian-Ukrainian Relations, held in Hamilton, Canada, October 8–9, 1981) (PDF). Edmonton: CIUS Press, University of Alberta. p. 354. ISBN 978-0-920862-84-1.
- The Foundations of Historical and Cultural Traditions in East Central Europe: Belorusia, Lithuania, Poland, Ukraine. - Lublin, 1993. - 450 pp.
- Belarus, Lithuania, Poland, Ukraine. The Foundations of Historical and Cultural Traditions in East Central Europe. - Rome-Lublin 1994, Wyd. Institute of East Central Europe i Fundacja Jana Pawła II - 503 pp.
- Pelenski, Jaroslaw (1998). The Contest for the Legacy of Kievan Rus'. East European monographs. New York: Columbia University Press. p. 325. ISBN 978-0-88033-274-3. Contained reprints of several earlier papers.

=== In Ukrainian ===
1950s–1970s

- Vjaceslav Lypynskyi in: Collection Ukrainian Literary Gazette (1956). - Munich, 1957. - pp. 197–213.
- Правні та ідеологічні обгрунтування включення українських земель до Коронної Польщі (1569) ["Legal and Ideological Bases of the Incorporation ofUkrainian Lands to the Polish Crown, 1569.]" in: Ювілейний збірник Української Вільної Академії наук. ["Jubilee of the Ukrainian Free Academy of Arts and Sciences"] - Вінніпег (Winnipeg), 1976. - С. 1-14. (based on a speech Pelenski gave on 25 October 1975 (p. 390) at the 25th anniversary meeting of the Ukrainian Free Academy of Arts and Sciences in Winnipeg).

1980s

- (co-translator) Подляський К. (pseudonym of Bohdan Skaradziński) Білоруси, литовці, українці: наші брати чи вороги? ("Byalorusians, Lithuanians, Ukrainians – our enemies or brothers?") (Мunich 1986), pp. 157. Translated from Polish.

Pelenski published articles in the Vidnova (Віднова) almanac of Eastern European politics, science and culture (Philadelphia, USA), of which he was editor-in-chief:

- До століття українського жіночого руху (1884–1984) ["To the centenary of the Ukrainian women's movement (1884–1984)"] in: Віднова. - 1984. - Т. 1. - С. 5-8.
- Книжковий огляд ["Book review"] in: Віднова. - 1984. - Т. 1. - С. 178-184.
- До проблеми україно-російських взаємин ["On the problem of Ukrainian-Russian relations"] in: Віднова. - 1984-1985. - Т. 2. - С. 5-21.
- До питання україно-польських взаємин ["On the question of Ukrainian-Polish relations"] in: Віднова. - 1985. - Т. 3. - С. 247-248.
- Україна і польська опозиція ["Ukraine and the Polish opposition"] in: Віднова. - 1985-1986. - Т. 4. - С. 5-21.
- Чорнобиль – трагедія України ["Chornobyl is a tragedy of Ukraine"] in: Віднова. - 1986. - Т. 5. - С. 5-8.
- "Гласність", "перебудова" і українська дійсність ["Glasnost", "perestroika" and the Ukrainian reality] in: Віднова. - 1987. - Т. 6/7. - С. 9-19.
- Книжковий огляд ["Book review"] in: Віднова. - 1987. - Т. 6/7. - С. 368-372.

1990s

- Сучасний консерватизм – лібералізм з ХІХ століття in: Філософська і соціологічна думка. - 1990. - № 11. - С. 3-7.
- [Похвала лекцій Івана Дзюби] in: Слово і час. - 1991. - № 12. - С. 43-46.
- Змагання за "Київський спадок" (1155-1175). Релігійно-духовний вимір in: Arheologia. - 1991. - № 3. - С. 33-46.
- Vyacheslav Lypynsky Україна на переломі, 1657-1659. - Філадельфія, 1991. - І-ХХ, 346 с.; Lypynsky V. Ukrainian at the Turning Point, 1657-1659: Notes on the History of Ukrainian State Building in the Seventeenth Century. - Philadelphia, 1991. - 416 pp.
- Вячеслав Липинський – основоположник державницької школи в українській історіографії in: Український історичний журнал. - 1992. - № 2. - С. 139-141.
- Останній Гетьман. Ювілейний збірни Міжнародної науково-практичної конференції присвяченій 120-річниці від дня народження Гетьмана П. Скоропадського і 75-річниці відновлення Української Держави 29 квітня 1918 року. - К.: Академпрес, 1993. - 280 с.
- Вячеслав Липинський. Історико-політична спадщина і сучасна Україна. Матеріали науково-практичної конференції, присвяченої В. Липинському (Київ-Луцьк, 2-7 червня 1992 р.). - Київ-Філадельфія, 1994. - 284 с.
- Dmytro Doroshenko Огляд української історіографії. - Київ., 1994. - 260 с.
- Pavlo Skoropadskyi. Спогади. Кінець 1917-грудень 1918. - Київ-Філадельфія, 1995. - 284 с.
- Початок московських духовних претензій на "Київський спадок" w: Нові історичні досліди

=== In German ===
- Pelenski, Jaroslav (1961). "Geschichtliches Denken und politische Ideen V. Lypynśkyjs: Zum 30. Todestag des ukrainischen Historikers und politischen Denkers (14. Juni 1961)". Jahrbücher für Geschichte Osteuropas. 9 (2). Franz Steiner Verlag: 223–246. ISSN 0021-4019. JSTOR 41041787.

=== In Polish ===
- Inkorporacja ukraińskich ziem dawnej Rusi do Korony w 1569 roku; Ideologia i korzyści – próba nowego spojrzenia w: Przegląd Historyczny ["Historical Review"]. - 1974. - LXV, 2. - pp. 243–262.

== Bibliography and literature ==
- Pavlo Hai-Nyzhnyk, Ярослав Пеленський. Етапи життєвого і наукового шляху ["Yaroslav Pelenskyi. Stages of his life and scholarly career"] in: Київська старовина Nr 1/2004 pp. 155–162 wersja elektroniczna
- Mirosław Filipowicz, Emigranci i Jankesi. O amerykańskich historykach Rosji, Lublin 2007, pp. 198–200.
