= Stójka, Podlaskie Voivodeship =

Stójka
- Village
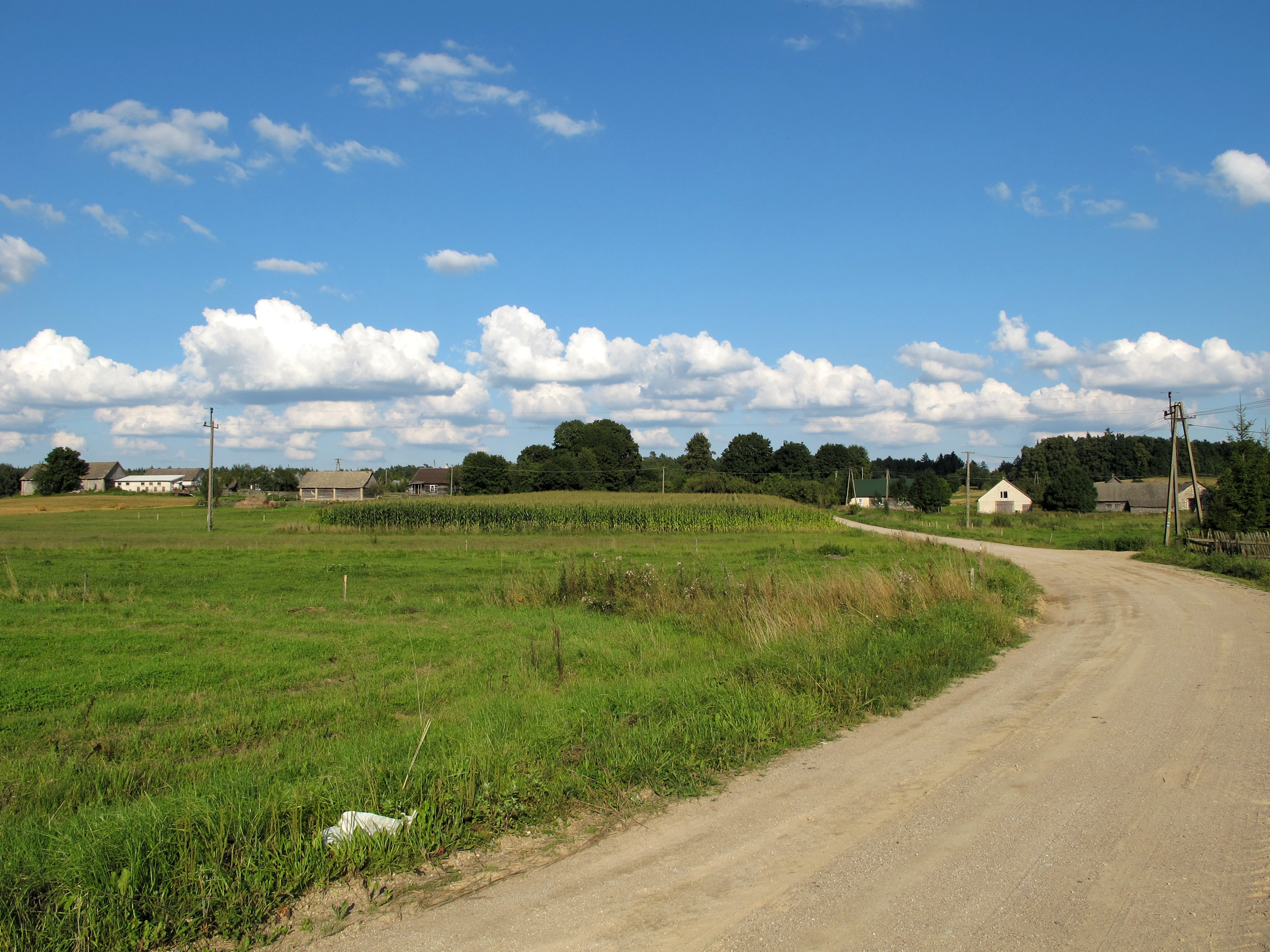
- Roadsign on Carska Droga, pointing to Stójka village

- Location within Poland
- Coordinates: 53°23′05″N 22°41′09″E
- Country: Poland
- Voivodeship: Podlaskie
- County: Mońki
- Gmina: Trzcianne

Stójka [ˈstui̯ka] is a village in the administrative district of Gmina Trzcianne, within Mońki County, Podlaskie Voivodeship, in north-eastern Poland.
