= Korczak =

Korczak may refer to:

== People ==
- Janusz Korczak (1878/79–1942), Polish pediatrician, children's writer and pedagogist
- Kaedan Korczak (born 2001), Canadian ice hockey player
- Korczak Ziolkowski (1908–1982), American designer and sculptor
- Rozka Korczak (1921–1988), a Jewish resistance fighter and partisan

== Other ==
- Korczak (film), a 1990 film on Janusz Korczak
- Korczak, Podlaskie Voivodeship, a village in Poland
- 2163 Korczak, main-belt asteroid

== See also ==
- Korczak coat of arms
- Kortschak, a surname
- Josef Korčák (1921–2008), Czech politician
