= Niewiarowo =

- Village
- Location within Poland
- Coordinates: 53°21′25″N 22°45′23″E
- Country: Poland
- Voivodeship: Podlaskie
- County: Mońki
- Gmina: Trzcianne

Niewiarowo [ɲɛvjaˈrɔvɔ] is a village in the administrative district of Gmina Trzcianne, within Mońki County, Podlaskie Voivodeship, in north-eastern Poland.
