= Gmina Trzcianne =

Gmina Trzcianne Trzcianne Commune
- Gmina
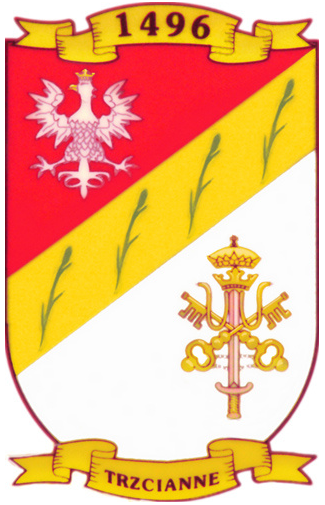
- Coat of arms

- Gmina Trzcianne within the Mońki County
- Coordinates (Trzcianne): 53°20′0″N 22°41′0″E
- Country: Poland
- Voivodeship: Podlaskie
- County: Mońki
- Seat: Trzcianne

Area
  - Total: 331.64 km^{2} (128.05 sq mi)

Population (2006)
  - Total: 4,701
  - Density: 14.18/km^{2} (36.71/sq mi)
- Website: http://www.trzcianne.ug.pl

Gmina Trzcianne is a rural gmina (administrative district) in Mońki County, Podlaskie Voivodeship, in north-eastern Poland. Its seat is the village of Trzcianne, which lies approximately 11 kilometres (7 mi) south-west of Mońki and 41 km (25 mi) north-west of the regional capital Białystok.

The gmina covers an area of 331.64 square kilometres (128.0 sq mi), and as of 2006 its total population is 4,701.

== Villages ==
Gmina Trzcianne contains the villages and settlements of Boguszewo, Boguszki, Brzeziny, Budy, Chojnowo, Dobarz, Giełczyn, Gugny, Kleszcze, Korczak, Krynica, Laskowiec, Milewo, Mroczki, Niewiarowo, Nowa Wieś, Pisanki, Stare Bajki, Stójka, Szorce, Trzcianne, Wilamówka, Wyszowate, Zajki, Zubole and Zucielec.

== Neighbouring gminas ==
Gmina Trzcianne is bordered by the gminas of Goniądz, Jedwabne, Krypno, Mońki, Radziłów, Tykocin, Wizna and Zawady.
