= Nowa Wieś, Mońki County =

Nowa Wieś
- Village
- Location within Poland
- Coordinates: 53°19′19″N 22°40′11″E
- Country: Poland
- Voivodeship: Podlaskie
- County: Mońki
- Gmina: Trzcianne

Population
  - Total: 575
- Postal code: 19-104
- Vehicle registration: BMN

Nowa Wieś [ˈnɔva ˈvjɛɕ] is a village in the administrative district of Gmina Trzcianne, within Mońki County, Podlaskie Voivodeship, in north-eastern Poland.

== History ==
According to the 1921 census, the village was inhabited by 767 people, among whom 762 were Roman Catholic, and 5 Jewish. At the same time, 767 inhabitants declared Polish nationality and 5 Jewish. There were 132 residential buildings in the village.

Four Polish citizens were murdered by Nazi Germany in the village during World War II.
