= Boguszewo, Gmina Trzcianne =

Boguszewo
- Village
- Location within Poland
- Coordinates: 53°20′09″N 22°46′50″E
- Country: Poland
- Voivodeship: Podlaskie
- County: Mońki
- Gmina: Trzcianne

Boguszewo [bɔɡuˈʂɛvɔ] is a village in the administrative district of Gmina Trzcianne, within Mońki County, Podlaskie Voivodeship, in north-eastern Poland.
