= Bohdan Skaradziński =

Polish writer and social activist

- Born: Bohdan Wojciech Skaradziński; January 5, 1931; Osowiec, Białystok Voivodeship, Second Polish Republic
- Died: May 4, 2014 (aged 83); Podkowa Leśna, Masovian Voivodeship, Third Polish Republic
- Education: Main School of Planning and Statistics
- Alma mater: University of Łódź
- Occupation: Writer
- Writing career
- Pen name: Jan Brzoza, Kazimierz Podlaski
- Language: Polish
- Genre: History
- Subject: History of Poland

Bohdan Skaradziński (pen names Jan Brzoza, Kazimierz Podlaski; 5 January 1931 – 4 May 2014) was a Polish writer and social activist.

== Biography ==
Born in Osowiec, between 1952 and 1956 he was repressed by the government of the People's Republic of Poland.

For many years, he was the editor of the monthly Więź. After 1989 he edited a section of Tygodnik Białostocki, entitled 'Sprawy Pobratymcze' (transl. Among brothers). His works focused on the 20th century history of Poland, in particular the relations between Poles and their eastern neighbors.

He was awarded the Solidarity award for his 1985 book Białorusini, Litwini, Ukraińcy (transl. Belarusians, Lithuanians and Ukrainians) and the Jerzy Łojek Award for his 1989 Polski rok 1919 (transl. Polish Year 1919).

With his wife he had a son and a daughter.

He lived and died in Podkowa Leśna.
