= Zubole =

- Village
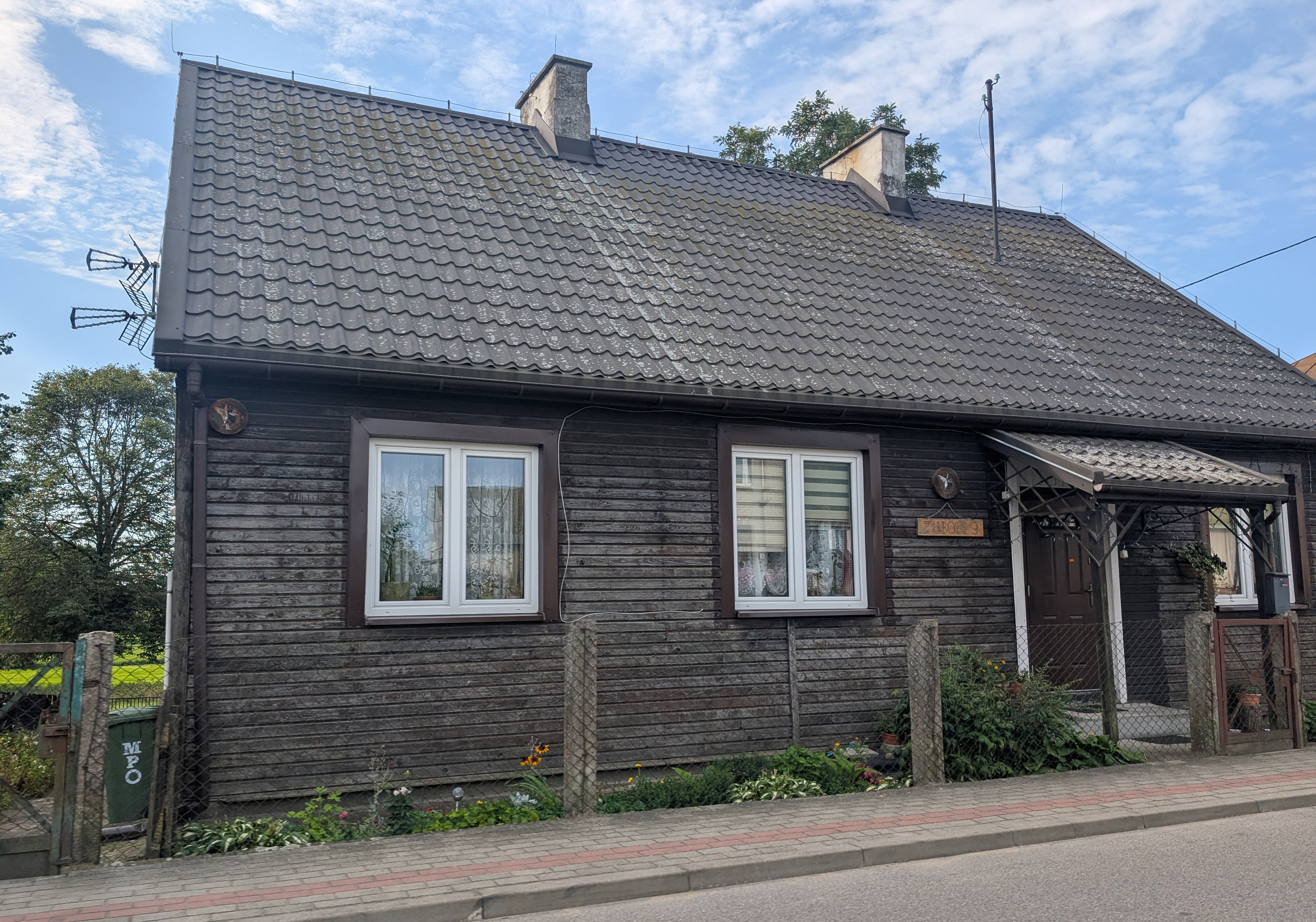

- Location within Poland
- Coordinates: 53°21′N 22°40′E
- Country: Poland
- Voivodeship: Podlaskie
- County: Mońki
- Gmina: Trzcianne
- Time zone: UTC+1 (CET)
  - Summer (DST): UTC+2 (CEST)
- Postal code: 19-104
- Vehicle registration: BMN

Zubole [zuˈbɔlɛ] is a village in the administrative district of Gmina Trzcianne, within Mońki County, Podlaskie Voivodeship, in north-eastern Poland.

== History ==
According to the 1921 census, the village was inhabited by 450 people, among whom 428 were Roman Catholic, 21 Jewish, and 1 Orthodox. At the same time, 436 inhabitants declared Polish nationality, and 14 Jewish. There were 81 residential buildings in the village.

During the German occupation in World War II, mass executions of Jews are perpetrated by Germans in Zubole. The Jews were kept in the gravel pit and then in a barn for almost a week before the series of shootings took place. From June 28 until July 1, 1941, approximately 600 Jews from nearby Trzcianne are murdered.
