= Kleszcze, Podlaskie Voivodeship =

Kleszcze
- Village
- Location within Poland
- Coordinates: 53°23′01″N 22°41′03″E
- Country: Poland
- Voivodeship: Podlaskie
- County: Mońki
- Gmina: Trzcianne

Kleszcze [ˈklɛʂt͡ʂɛ] is a village in the administrative district of Gmina Trzcianne, within Mońki County, Podlaskie Voivodeship, in north-eastern Poland.
