= Brzeziny, Podlaskie Voivodeship =

Brzeziny
- Village
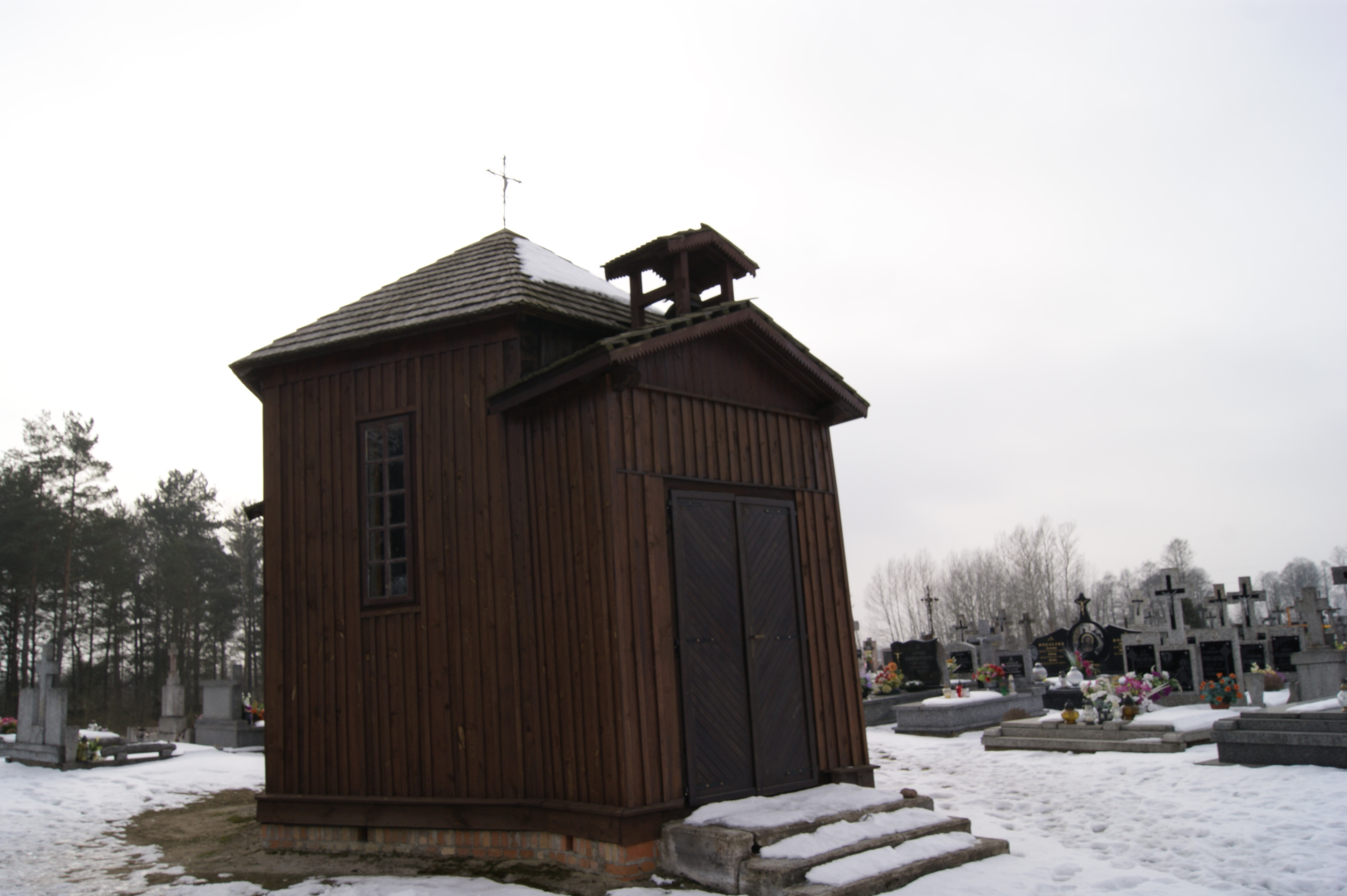

- Location within Poland
- Coordinates: 53°14′19″N 22°32′14″E
- Country: Poland
- Voivodeship: Podlaskie
- County: Mońki
- Gmina: Trzcianne

Brzeziny [bʐɛˈʑinɨ] is a village in the administrative district of Gmina Trzcianne, within Mońki County, Podlaskie Voivodeship, in north-eastern Poland.

According to the 1921 census, the village was inhabited by 430 people, among whom 423 were Roman Catholic, and 7 Mosaic. At the same time, all inhabitants declared Polish nationality. There were 76 residential buildings in the village.
