= Krynica, Mońki County =

Krynica
- Village
- Location within Poland
- Coordinates: 53°18′N 22°41′E
- Country: Poland
- Voivodeship: Podlaskie
- County: Mońki
- Gmina: Trzcianne

Krynica [krɨˈnit͡sa] is a village in the administrative district of Gmina Trzcianne, within Mońki County, Podlaskie Voivodeship, in north-eastern Poland.
