= Kortschak =

Kortschak is a surname. Notable people with the surname include:

- Hugo Kortschak (1884–1957), Austrian-born American violinist
- Hugo P. Kortschak (1911–1983), American biologist, son of Hugo

== See also ==
- Korczak (disambiguation)
