= Mroczki, Mońki County =

Mroczki
- Village
- Location within Poland
- Coordinates: 53°23′N 22°40′E
- Country: Poland
- Voivodeship: Podlaskie
- County: Mońki
- Gmina: Trzcianne

Mroczki (Polish pronunciation: [ˈmrɔt͡ʂkʲi]) is a village in the administrative district of Gmina Trzcianne, within Mońki County, Podlaskie Voivodeship, in north-eastern Poland.
