= Szorce =

- Village
- Location within Poland
- Coordinates: 53°18′N 22°41′E
- Country: Poland
- Voivodeship: Podlaskie
- County: Mońki
- Gmina: Trzcianne

Szorce [ˈʂɔrt͡sɛ] is a village in the administrative district of Gmina Trzcianne, within Mońki County, Podlaskie Voivodeship, in north-eastern Poland.

According to the 1921 census, the village was inhabited by 475 people, among whom 469 were Roman Catholic and 16 Mosaic. At the same time, 469 inhabitants declared Polish nationality, 6 Jewish. There were 80 residential buildings in the village.
