= Chojnowo, Mońki County =

Chojnowo
- Village
- Location within Poland
- Coordinates: 53°22′N 22°39′E
- Country: Poland
- Voivodeship: Podlaskie
- County: Mońki
- Gmina: Trzcianne

Chojnowo [xɔi̯ˈnɔvɔ] is a village in the administrative district of Gmina Trzcianne, within Mońki County, Podlaskie Voivodeship, in north-eastern Poland.
