= Stare Bajki =

- Village
- Location within Poland
- Coordinates: 53°18′13″N 22°44′10″E
- Country: Poland
- Voivodeship: Podlaskie
- County: Mońki
- Gmina: Trzcianne

Stare Bajki [ˈstarɛ ˈbai̯ki] is a village in the administrative district of Gmina Trzcianne, within Mońki County, Podlaskie Voivodeship, in north-eastern Poland.
