= Laskowiec, Podlaskie Voivodeship =

Laskowiec
- Village
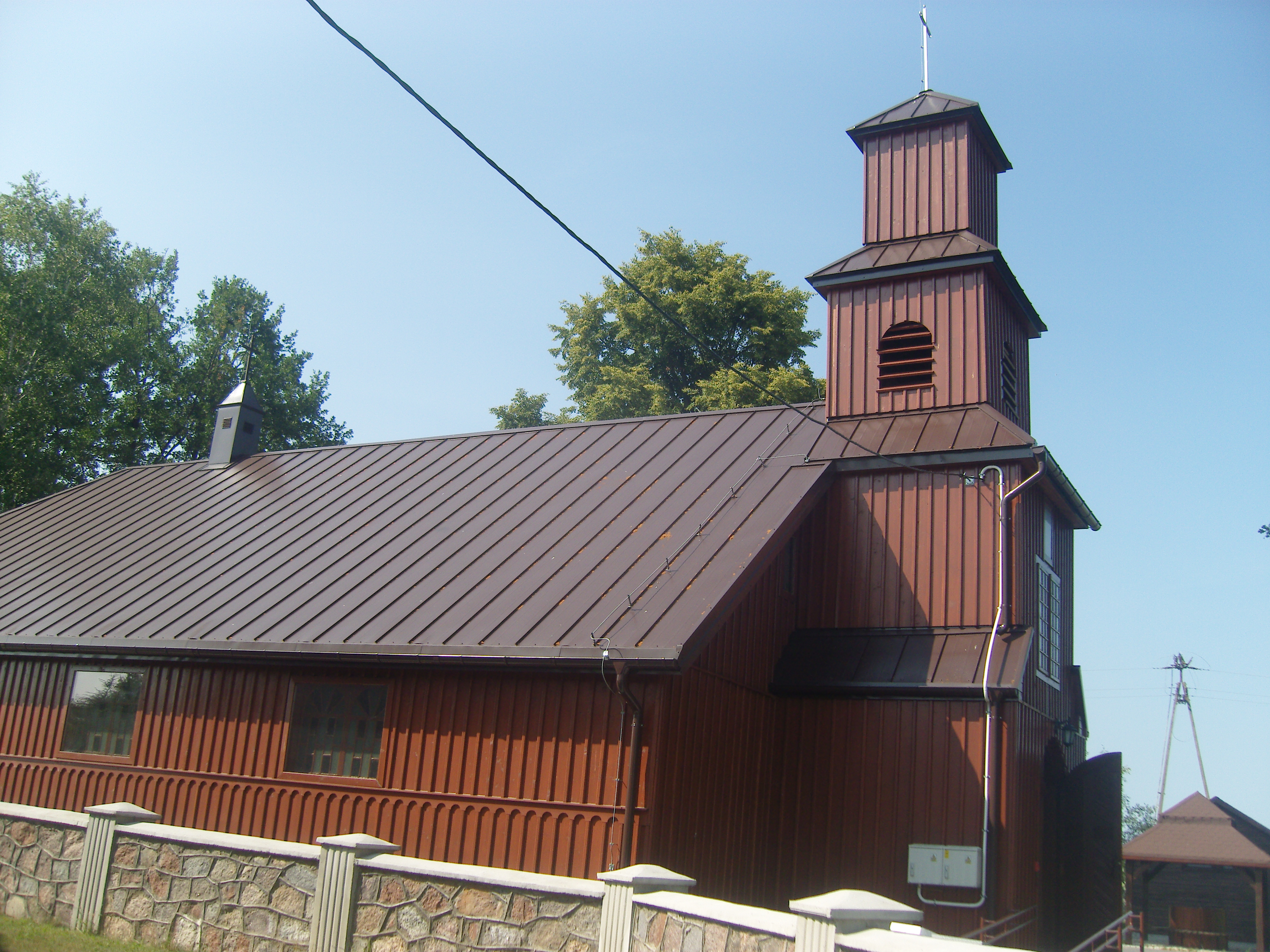

- Location within Poland
- Coordinates: 53°13′52″N 22°33′44″E
- Country: Poland
- Voivodeship: Podlaskie
- County: Mońki
- Gmina: Trzcianne

Laskowiec [lasˈkɔvjɛt͡s] is a village in the administrative district of Gmina Trzcianne, within Mońki County, Podlaskie Voivodeship, in north-eastern Poland.

According to the 1921 census, the village was inhabited by 238 people, among whom 226 were Roman Catholic and 12 Mosaic. At the same time, 238 inhabitants declared Polish nationality, 12 Jewish. There were 45 residential buildings in the village.
