= Polish Society for the Protection of Birds =

Polish Society for the Protection of Birds (Polish: Ogólnopolskie Towarzystwo Ochrony Ptaków, OTOP) is a non-governmental organization set up in Poland in 1991. Among OTOP's tasks are preserving wild living birds and their nests, gathering information about them and study their life. Furthermore, OTOP popularizes ornithology among people from various social groups and different ages. OTOP is the Polish partner to BirdLife International.

When Gerard Sawicki was the president of society, he ran the TV program Ptakolub(birdlover) transmitted on TVP1 at the end of the 20th century. The current president of society is Dariusz Bukaciński.

OTOP employs Małgorzata Górska, the 2010 Goldman Environmental Prize Winner. In April 2008 a website OTOPJunior was created in order to encourage the youngest to get interested in birds.
