= Wyszowate, Podlaskie Voivodeship =

Wyszowate
- Village
- Location within Poland
- Coordinates: 53°18′N 22°44′E
- Country: Poland
- Voivodeship: Podlaskie
- County: Mońki
- Gmina: Trzcianne

Wyszowate [vɨʂɔˈvatɛ] is a village in the administrative district of Gmina Trzcianne, within Mońki County, Podlaskie Voivodeship, in north-eastern Poland.

== History ==
Family nest of the noble (szlachta) family of Wiszowaty (using "Roch/Pirzchała" coat of arms). The most famous member of the family was Andrzej Wiszowaty - 17th century philosopher and Socinian theologian. The oldest information about the village was recorded in 1445 and lists three founders of the village: Stanisław, Mroczek and Jan Wiszowaty. The family Wiszowaty still lives there. The village was destroyed several times in the past. Last time during World War II in August 1944 the village was almost totally burned down by Soviet Fighter aircraft.
