= Milewo, Mońki County =

Milewo
- Village
- Location within Poland
- Coordinates: 53°24′N 22°43′E
- Country: Poland
- Voivodeship: Podlaskie
- County: Mońki
- Gmina: Trzcianne

Milewo [miˈlɛvɔ] is a village in the administrative district of Gmina Trzcianne, within Mońki County, Podlaskie Voivodeship, in north-eastern Poland.

According to the 1921 census, the village was inhabited by 156 people, among whom 148 were Roman Catholic, 1 Orthodox, and 7 Mosaic. At the same time, all inhabitants declared Polish nationality. There were 29 residential buildings in the village.
