= Zucielec =

- Village
- Location within Poland
- Coordinates: 53°22′N 22°42′E
- Country: Poland
- Voivodeship: Podlaskie
- County: Mońki
- Gmina: Trzcianne

Zucielec [zuˈt͡ɕɛlɛt͡s] is a village in the administrative district of Gmina Trzcianne, within Mońki County, Podlaskie Voivodeship, in north-eastern Poland.
