= Mirosław Tryczyk =

Polish writer (born 1977)

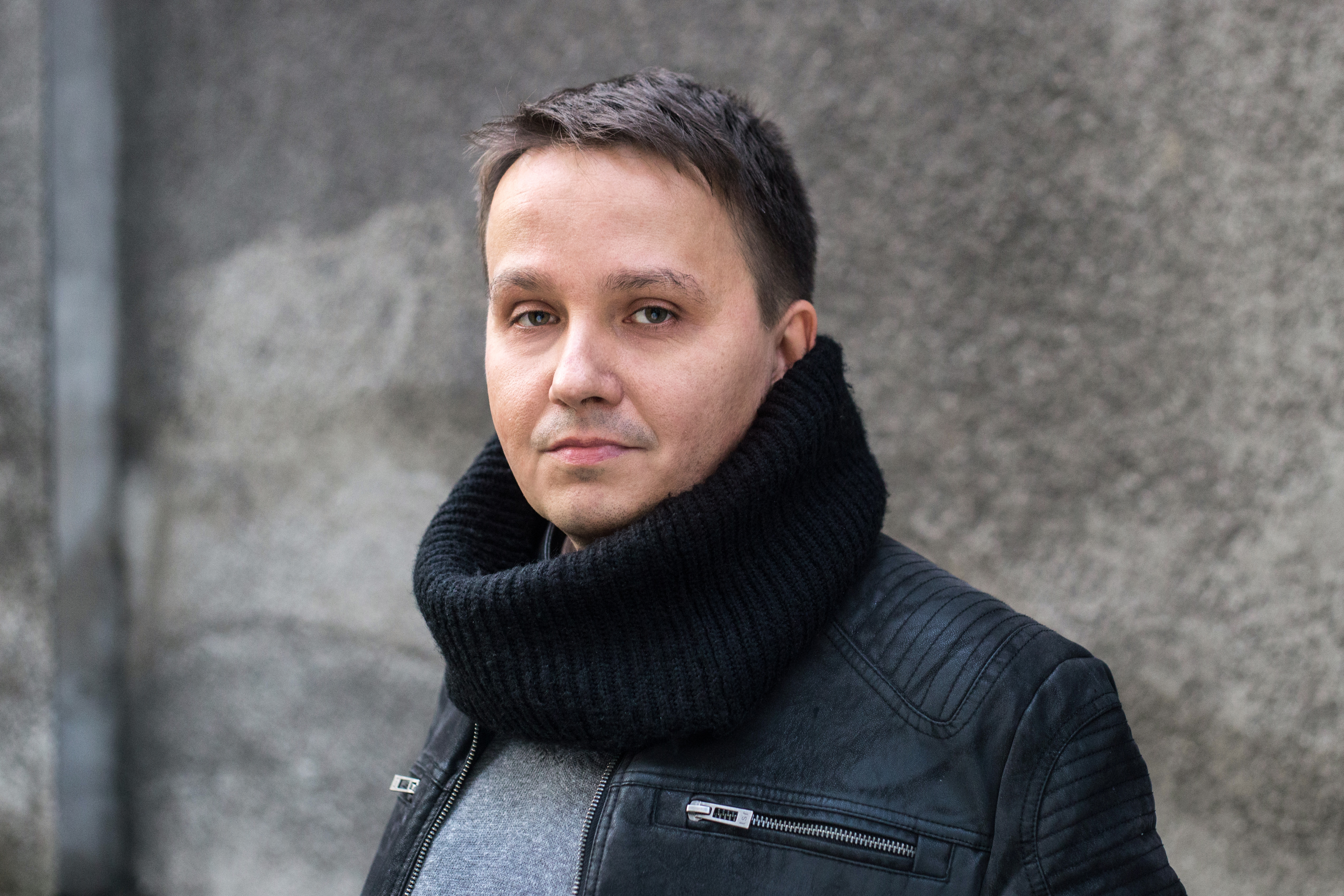
- Born: 1977 (age 48–49); Wrocław
- Education: University of Wrocław
- Occupations: Philosopher; writer; reporter

Mirosław Tryczyk (born 1977) is a Polish philosopher, writer, reporter, and Holocaust researcher.

== Biography ==
Tryczyk was born in Wrocław in 1977. He graduated in philosophy from the Faculty of Social Sciences of the University of Wrocław, where he obtained his doctorate in 2007. After graduation, he was a philosophy teacher at the Belgian Polonia Secondary School no. XIV in Wrocław; he also collaborated with the Higher School of Banking in Wrocław, the "Edukacja" Higher School of Management, and the University of Lower Silesia in Wrocław. In the years 2015–2017, he was a researcher at the Jewish Historical Institute in Warsaw. In 2019, the Polin Museum of the History of Polish Jews selected him for a nomination awarded to persons, organizations or institutions actively working to protect the memory of the history of Polish Jews.

He is the author of books on the history of Russia and the history of the Holocaust.

His book "Drzazga. Kłamstwa silniejsze niż śmierć" (A Splinter. Lies Stronger Than Death), describing the pogroms of Jews in 1941 and their consequences for contemporary Poland, was included in the "ten" books nominated for the Ryszard Kapuściński, for the best literary reportage (2021) and also reached the finals of the Angelus Central European Literary Award (2021) and of the finals of the 8th edition of the Teresa Torańska Newsweek Awards (2021) the book was also awarded the title of The Best Polish Reportage of 2020 by the portal CzytamyReportaże.pl. His book "Miasta śmierci. Sąsiedzkie pogromy Żydów" (2015), was translated into English by prof. Frank Szmulowicz and appeared in print in the American scientific publishing house Rowman & Littlefield under the title "The Towns of Death. Pogroms Against Jews by Their Neighbors" (2021).

In 2020, he was a historical consultant for the film "Wesele (film 2021)" directed by Wojciech Smarzowski.

Mirosław Tryczyk has one daughter.

== Selected publications and interviews ==
Books:

- Między imperium a świętą Rosją (Between the Empire and the Holy Russia), Nova Res Publishing House, Gdynia, 2009.
- Miasta śmierci. Sąsiedzkie pogromy Żydów (Towns of Death. Pogroms Against Jews by Their Neighbors), Wydawnictwo RM, Warsaw, 2015.
- Drzazga. Kłamstwa silniejsze niż śmierć (A Splinter. Lies Stronger Than Death), Znak Social Publishing House, Cracow, 2020.
- The Towns of Death. Pogroms Against Jews by Their Neighbors, Lexington Books, Rowman & Littlefield, USA, 2021.

Scientific and popular science texts:

- Twarde sumienie. Leczenie pamięci (Hard Conscience. Healing of Memory), Kwartalnik Historyczny Karta, no. 85/2015 (Karta Historical Quarterly)
- Żydówki ze Szczuczyna (Jewish Women of Szczuczyn), Kwartalnik Historyczny Karta (Karta Historical Quarterly), no. 89/2016.
- Biłgoraj. Sztetl z polską władzą (Bilgoraj. A Shtetl with Polish Authorities), Kwartalnik Historyczny Karta (Karta Historical Quarterly), No. 90/2017.
- Reply to Krzysztof Persak, Studia Literraria et Historica, 5/2016.

Selected interviews:

- Splintered histories: confronting the legacy of wartime pogroms in rural Poland, Notes from Poland, Jun 1, 2020.
- Cities of Death, Chidusz / Jewish magazine, 28.12.2016.
