= Giełczyn, Mońki County =

Giełczyn
- Village
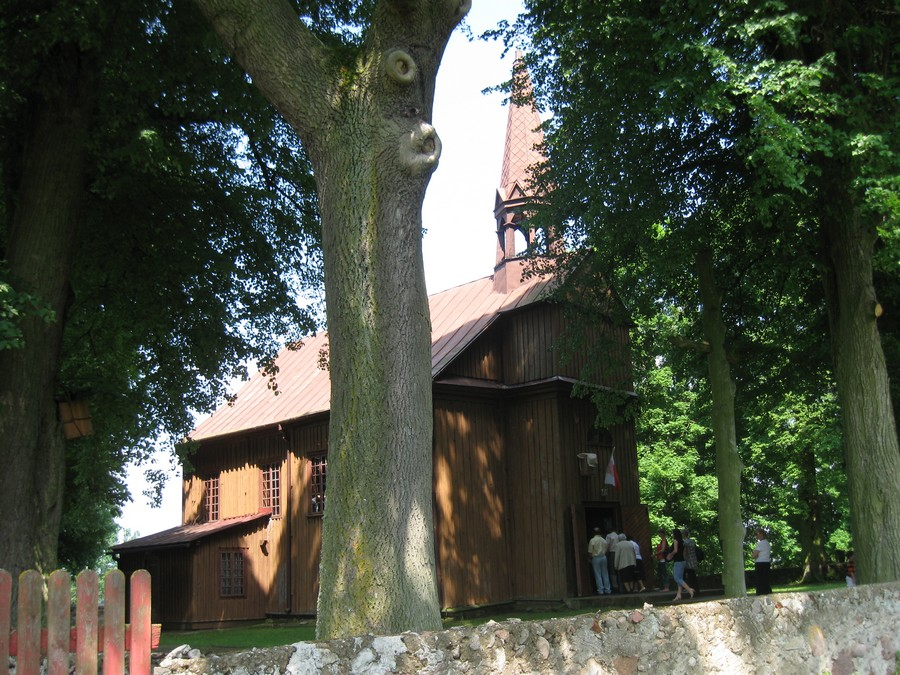
- Church of the Visitation of the Blessed Virgin Mary in Giełczyn

- Location within Poland
- Coordinates: 53°13′48″N 22°28′55″E
- Country: Poland
- Voivodeship: Podlaskie
- County: Mońki
- Gmina: Trzcianne

Giełczyn [ˈɡʲɛu̯t͡ʂɨn] is a village in the administrative district of Gmina Trzcianne, within Mońki County, Podlaskie Voivodeship, in north-eastern Poland.
