= Korczak, Podlaskie Voivodeship =

Korczak
- Village
- Location within Poland
- Coordinates: 53°23′06″N 22°41′06″E
- Country: Poland
- Voivodeship: Podlaskie
- County: Mońki
- Gmina: Trzcianne

Korczak [ˈkɔrt͡ʂak] is a village in the administrative district of Gmina Trzcianne, within Mońki County, Podlaskie Voivodeship, in north-eastern Poland.
