= Dobarz =

- Village
- Location within Poland
- Coordinates: 53°22′14″N 22°35′29″E
- Country: Poland
- Voivodeship: Podlaskie
- County: Mońki
- Gmina: Trzcianne
- Population: 30

Dobarz [ˈdɔbaʂ] is a village in the administrative district of Gmina Trzcianne, within Mońki County, Podlaskie Voivodeship, in north-eastern Poland.
