= Mężenin, Zambrów County =

Mężenin
- Village
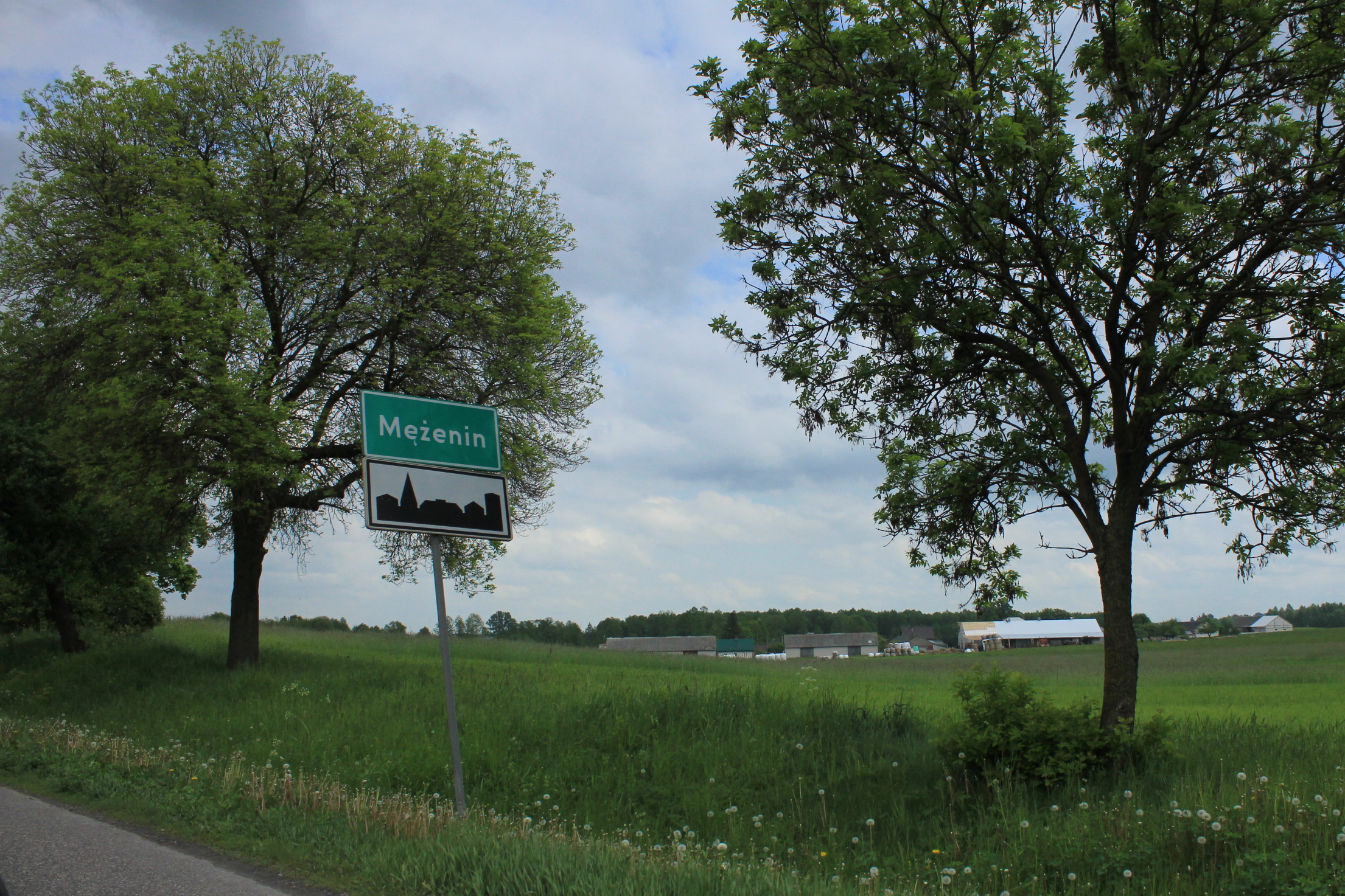

- Location within Poland
- Coordinates: 53°5′28″N 22°28′21″E
- Country: Poland
- Voivodeship: Podlaskie
- County: Zambrów
- Gmina: Rutki

Mężenin [mɛ̃ˈʐɛnin] is a village in the administrative district of Gmina Rutki, within Zambrów County, Podlaskie Voivodeship, in north-eastern Poland.
