= Budy, Mońki County =

Budy
- Village
- Location within Poland
- Coordinates: 53°23′16″N 22°34′24″E
- Country: Poland
- Voivodeship: Podlaskie
- County: Mońki
- Gmina: Trzcianne
- Population: 10

Budy [ˈbudɨ] is a village in the administrative district of Gmina Trzcianne, within Mońki County, Podlaskie Voivodeship, in north-eastern Poland.
