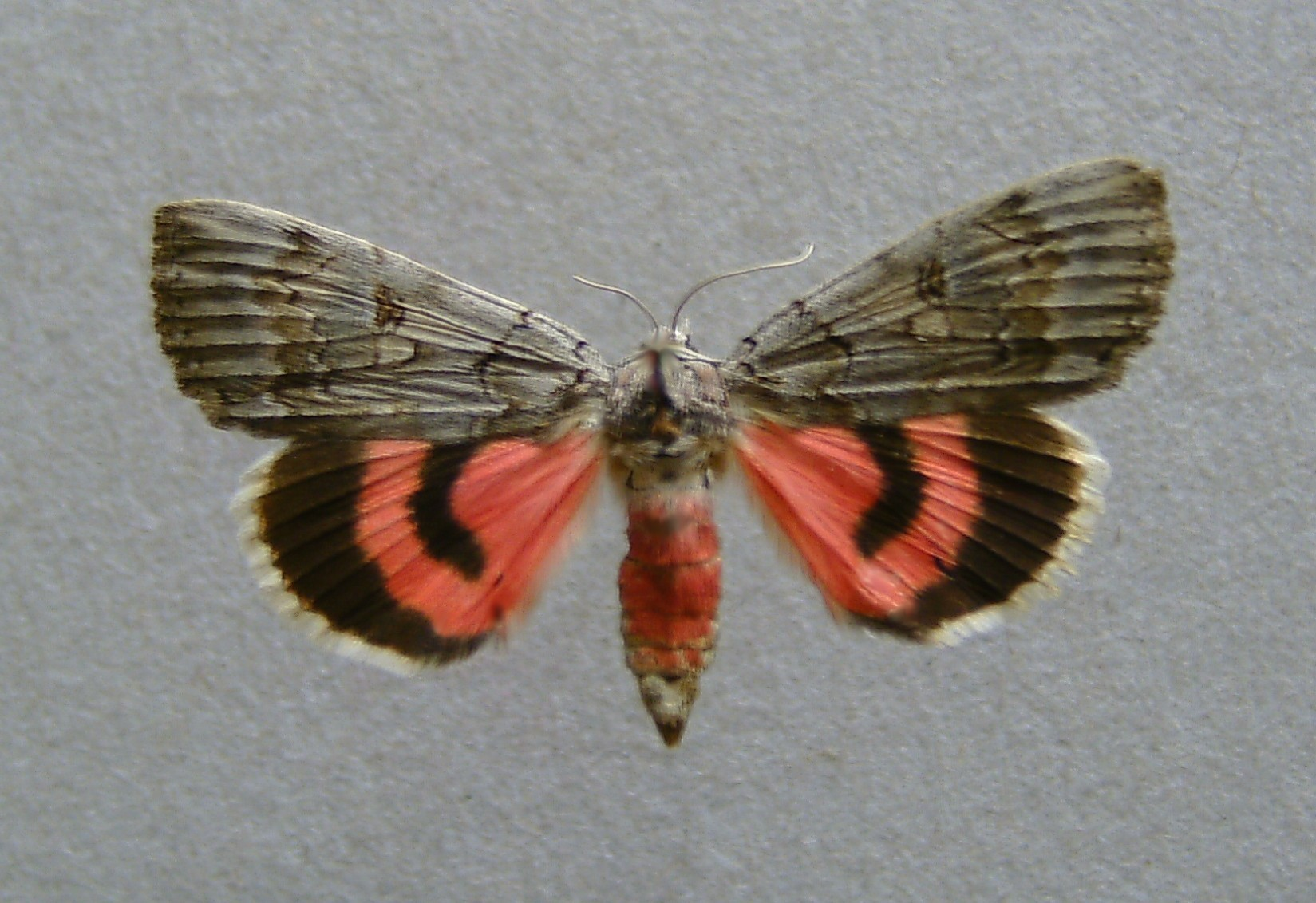

Scientific classification
- Kingdom: Animalia
- Phylum: Arthropoda
- Class: Insecta
- Order: Lepidoptera
- Superfamily: Noctuoidea
- Family: Erebidae
- Genus: Catocala
- Species: C. pacta

Binomial name
- Catocala pacta (Linnaeus, 1758)

Synonyms
- Phalaena pacta Linnaeus, 1758; Noctua pacta var. suecica Esper, 1787

= Catocala pacta =

Species of moth

Catocala pacta is a moth of the family Erebidae. It is found from southern Sweden, east to Finland, Poland, the Baltic states, to the Ural and the Amur regions south of Tibet.

The Catocala pacta's wingspan is 42–52 mm. Adults are on wing from July to September.

The larvae feed on Salix species, including Salix caprea and Salix cinerea.

== Subspecies ==
- Catocala pacta pacta
- Catocala pacta deserta Kozhanchikov, 1925
