= Strękowa Góra =

- Village
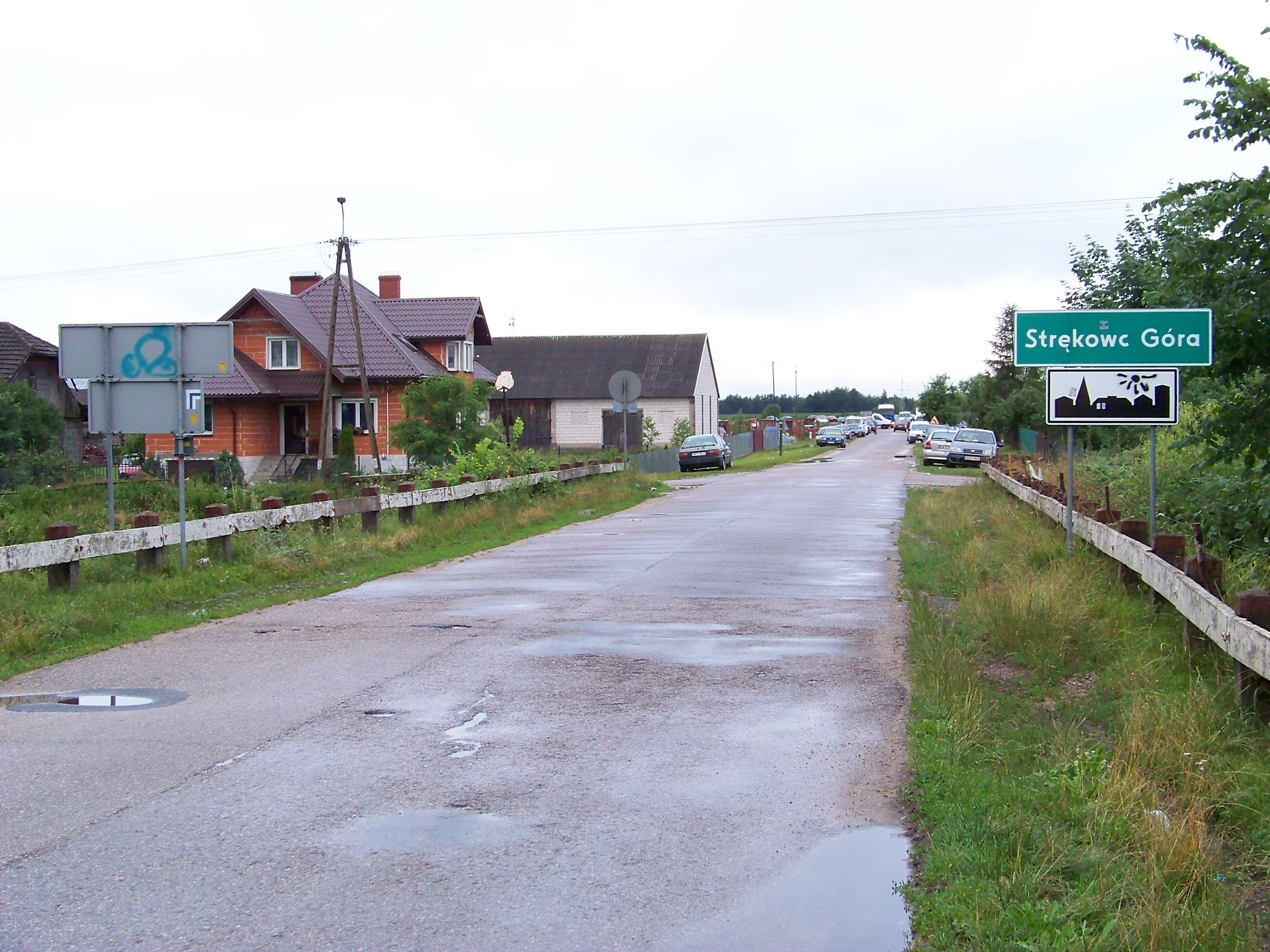

- Location within Poland
- Coordinates: 53°13′N 22°33′E
- Country: Poland
- Voivodeship: Podlaskie
- County: Białystok
- Gmina: Zawady
- Population: 190
- Website: http://www.strekowagora.cba.pl

Strękowa Góra [strɛŋˈkɔva ˈɡura] is a village in the administrative district of Gmina Zawady, within Białystok County, Podlaskie Voivodeship, in north-eastern Poland.

The village lies on the Narew River.
