= Biebrza Marshes =

Wildlife refuge in Poland

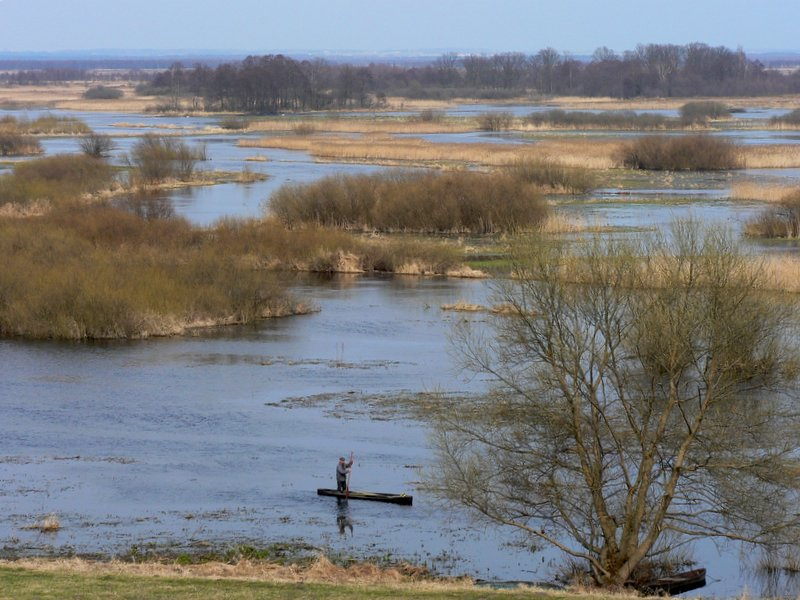
Biebrza river in Burzyn, Poland

The Biebrza Marshes (Biebrza Valley) are a wetland complex, located on the Biebrza river valley, in Suwałki, Łomża in the northeast of Poland. The area encompasses river channels, lakes, extensive marshes with wooded areas on higher ground, such as alder carrs, and well-preserved peat bogs that occupy around 1,000 km^{2}. The area shows a clear succession of habitats from riverside fen through to raised bogs, grading into wet woodland. Because of this unique succession, the area supports a wide diversity of wildlife with large numbers of birds and mammals. Over 250 species of birds have been recorded including more than 80% of the Polish avifauna. Starting in the early spring mating birds attract birdwatchers from around the world.

The marshes in the area are commonly flooded and the resulting alluvial soil supports an array of wetland vegetation.

It is one of the largest wildlife refuges in Europe. The greater part of this area is the Biebrza National Park, covered by the Ramsar Convention to protect the wetlands and bird breeding grounds.

== Flora and vegetation ==
In the area of the Biebrza Marshes 43 plant associations were distinguished, some rarely seen in other parts of Poland. Major communities are water, marsh, peat, reeds and forest communities including (alder, birch, riparian forests). Particularly valuable is a large group of sedge-moss communities, containing many rare and relict species, disappearing in other parts of the country.

The vegetation is characterized by great diversity, a high degree of naturalness and the presence of many rare species, such as:

- shrub birch and downy willow
- Forkbeards: Lycopodium annotinum, clubmoss, fir
- pink sand, Chimaphila umbellata, Polemonium caeruleum
- sundew: Drosera rotundifolia, Drosera anglica
- Pedicularis sceptrum-carolinum, marsh gentian, Swertia perennis
- Siberian iris.
- orchids (20 species), among others: Lady's slipper orchid, Dactylorhiza incarnata.

== Fauna ==
Biebrza Marshes are the most important breeding area for many wetland bird species in Poland and amongst the most important in Central and Western Europe. This importance is increasing as wetlands are disappearing from the landscape of Europe. Biebrza Valley is of great importance for many species of birds feeding and resting during the annual migrations. There are also boreal breeding species, and species whose geographical center is located in the taiga and tundra zone.

Among the mammals in the Biebrza Marshes are:

- moose, which only survived here for World War II and was protected by multiply and spread on Polish territory
- red deer, roe deer, wild boar, brown hare, European beaver
- wolf, fox, raccoon, badger, polecat, pine marten, otter, stoat, weasel

In the waters of Biebrza, there are approximately 36 species of fish such as pike, Wels catfish, eel, and also typical of the foothills of chub and barbel.
