= Osowiec, Mońki County =

Osowiec
- Village
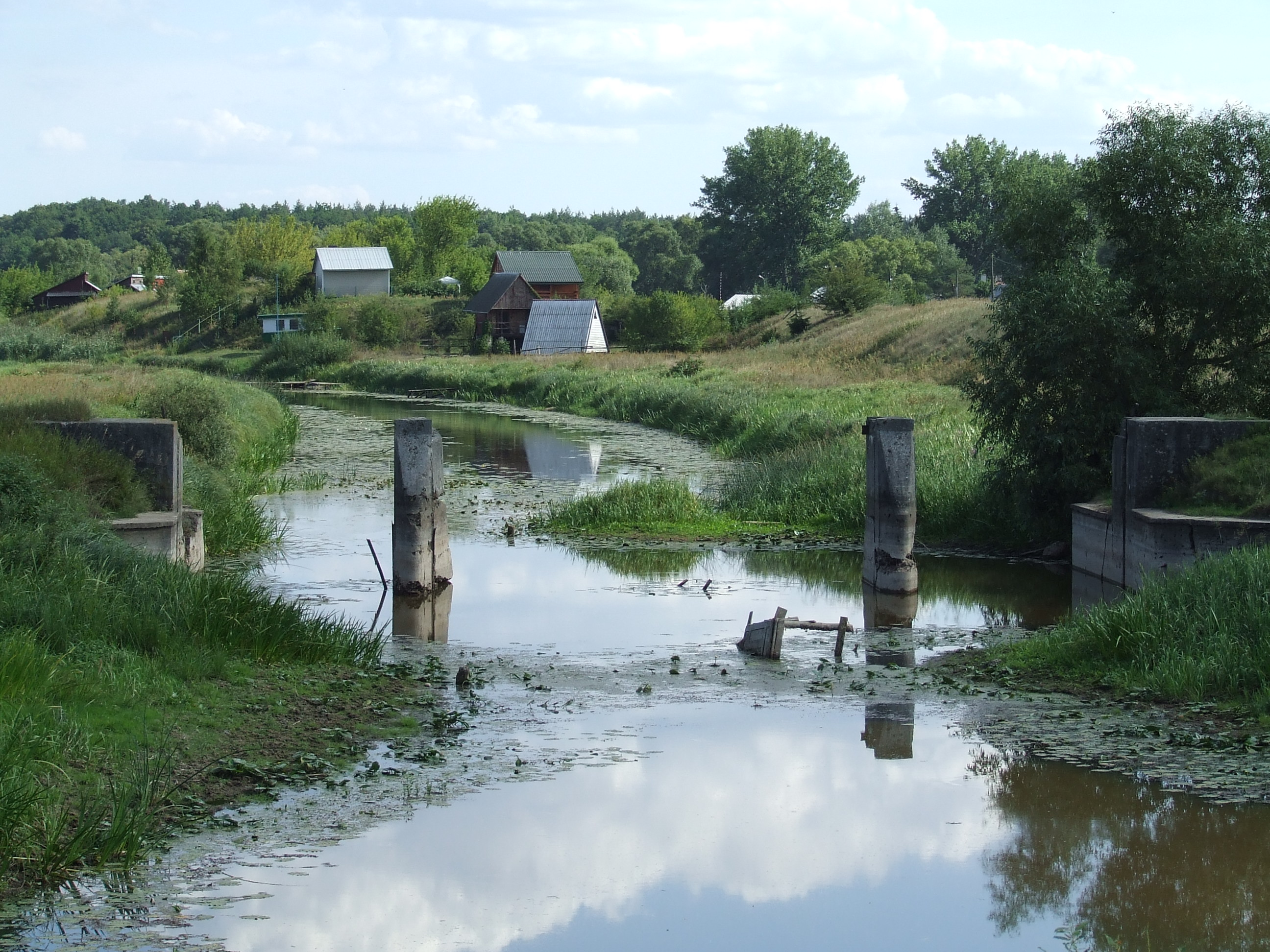

- Location within Poland
- Coordinates: 53°30′18″N 22°39′01″E
- Country: Poland
- Voivodeship: Podlaskie
- County: Mońki
- Gmina: Goniądz
- Population: 60

Osowiec [ɔˈsɔvjɛt͡s] is a village in the administrative district of Gmina Goniądz, within Mońki County, Podlaskie Voivodeship, in north-eastern Poland.
