= Trzcianne =

Village in Podlaskie Voivodeship, Poland

- Village
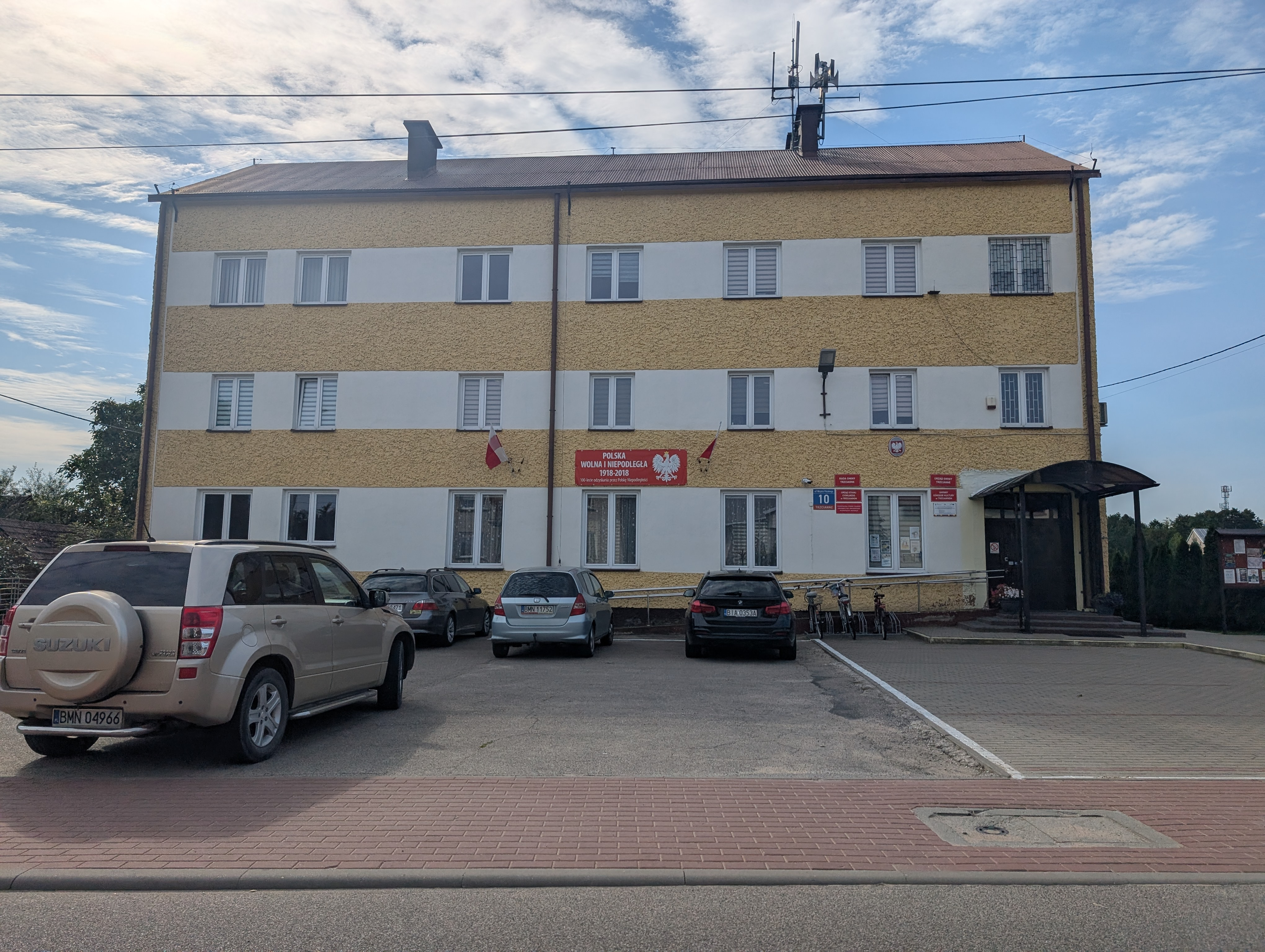
- Gmina office in Trzcianne

- Location within Poland
- Coordinates: 53°20′N 22°41′E
- Country: Poland
- Voivodeship: Podlaskie
- County: Mońki
- Gmina: Trzcianne

Population
  - Total: 610
- Time zone: UTC+1 (CET)
  - Summer (DST): UTC+2 (CEST)
- Postal code: 19-104
- Vehicle registration: BMN

Trzcianne ([ˈtʂt͡ɕannɛ]) (Note: Yiddish: טרעסטיני, romanized: Trestiny) is a village in Mońki County, Podlaskie Voivodeship, in north-eastern Poland. It is the seat of the gmina (administrative district) called Gmina Trzcianne. It is close to Biebrza National Park.

== History ==
Historical population
| Year | Pop. | ±% |
|---|---|---|
| 1878 | 2,057 | — |
| 1921 | 1,434 | −30.3% |

First records of Trzcianne come from the 13th century. The name probably comes from reeds (Polish: trzcina) surrounding the river that flowed through the village.

The lands of Trzcianne first belonged to the Baltic Yotvingians. Then Trzcianne became part of the Wizna Land, created in the 14th century, of the Duchy of Masovia, within which it was located on the border of Goniądz and Tykocin counties. Then, Trczianne belonged to the Bielsk Land that was part of Podlachia, first within the Grand Duchy of Lithuania and then the Kingdom of Poland.

According to the records of Alexander Jagiellon, Grand Duke of Lithuania, the first Catholic church in Trzcianne was built before 1496 and it survived c. 100 years. Trzcianne was the location of one of the Roman Catholic churches within the Grand Duchy of Lithuania where the priests had to know the Lithuanian language according to the Grand Duke of Lithuania Alexander Jagiellon in 1501. The current, fourth church in Trzcianne was built in 1846 and consecrated in 1860. Town rights were granted before 1700 and revoked in 1801. The first Jews arrived in Trzcianne in the 18th century.

Trzcianne was annexed by Prussia in the First Partition of Poland in 1795. In 1807 it was regained by Poles and included within the short-lived Duchy of Warsaw. After the dissolution of the duchy, the village passed to the Russian Partition of Poland. It became part of the so-called Pale of Settlement, where Jewish settlement within the Russian Empire was allowed, thus by the 20th century, Jews were a majority of Trzcianne's population, making it a shtetl. In the 1909 census, 98% of Trzcianne's population was Jewish. There is still an old Jewish cemetery in the village, but it is not tended by anyone. There is an ongoing restoration of the cemetery led by a descendant living in the U.S.

According to the 1921 Polish census, the village had a total population of 1,434 people. Of these, 1,401 were Jews. The remaining 33 inhabitants were Catholic Poles. There were 177 residential buildings in the village.

=== World War II ===
Holocaust memorial at the Jewish cemetery

Following the German-Soviet invasion of Poland, which started World War II in September 1939, the village was first occupied by the Soviet Union. A local Polish policeman was murdered by the Russians in the Katyn massacre in 1940. When the Germans occupied the area in June 1941, they set fire to the whole village. Then, they gathered together more than 1,000 local Jews in the neighboring village of Zubole. The Jews were kept in the gravel pit and then in a barn for almost a week before the series mass executions took place. 400 to 700 Jews were murdered. The rest of the Jews were released. In autumn of 1941, a ghetto was created in Trzcianne. It lasted until November 2, 1942, when the Jews from the ghetto were sent to the Bogusze transit camp. A few weeks later, with Jews from surrounding town and villages, they were sent to Treblinka and Auschwitz death camps. Right before World War II, there were about 2,500 Jews living in the village, only 25 Trzcianne Jews survived the Holocaust.

Both during and after World War II, many inhabitants of Trzcianne were deported to Kazakhstan by the Soviets.

After German occupation ended in 1944, the town was restored to Poland, although with a Soviet-installed communist regime, which stayed in power until the Fall of Communism in the 1980s. The Polish anti-communist resistance was active in Trzcianne, and in 1945 it raided a local communist police station.

== Sights ==
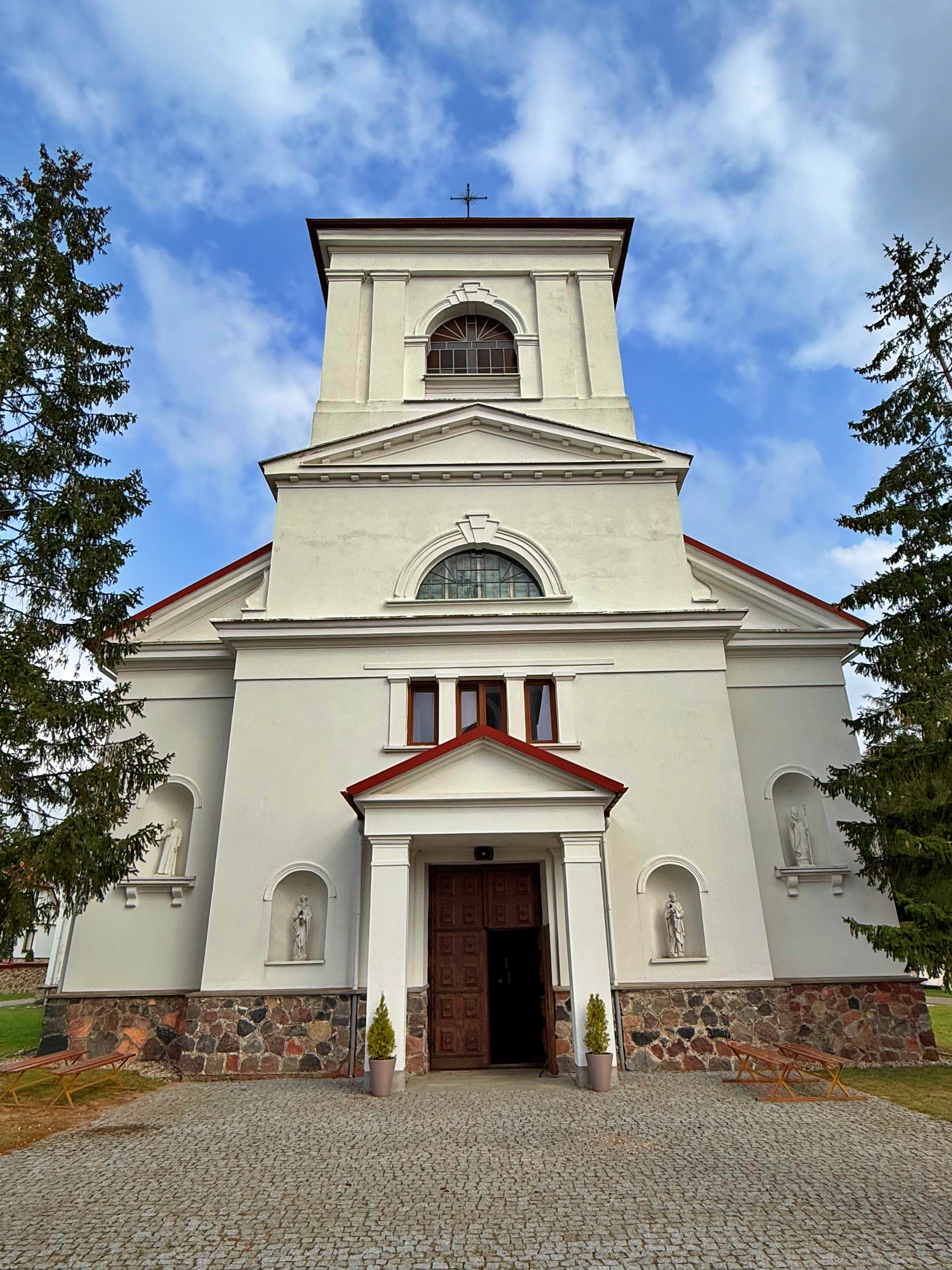
Saints Peter and Paul church

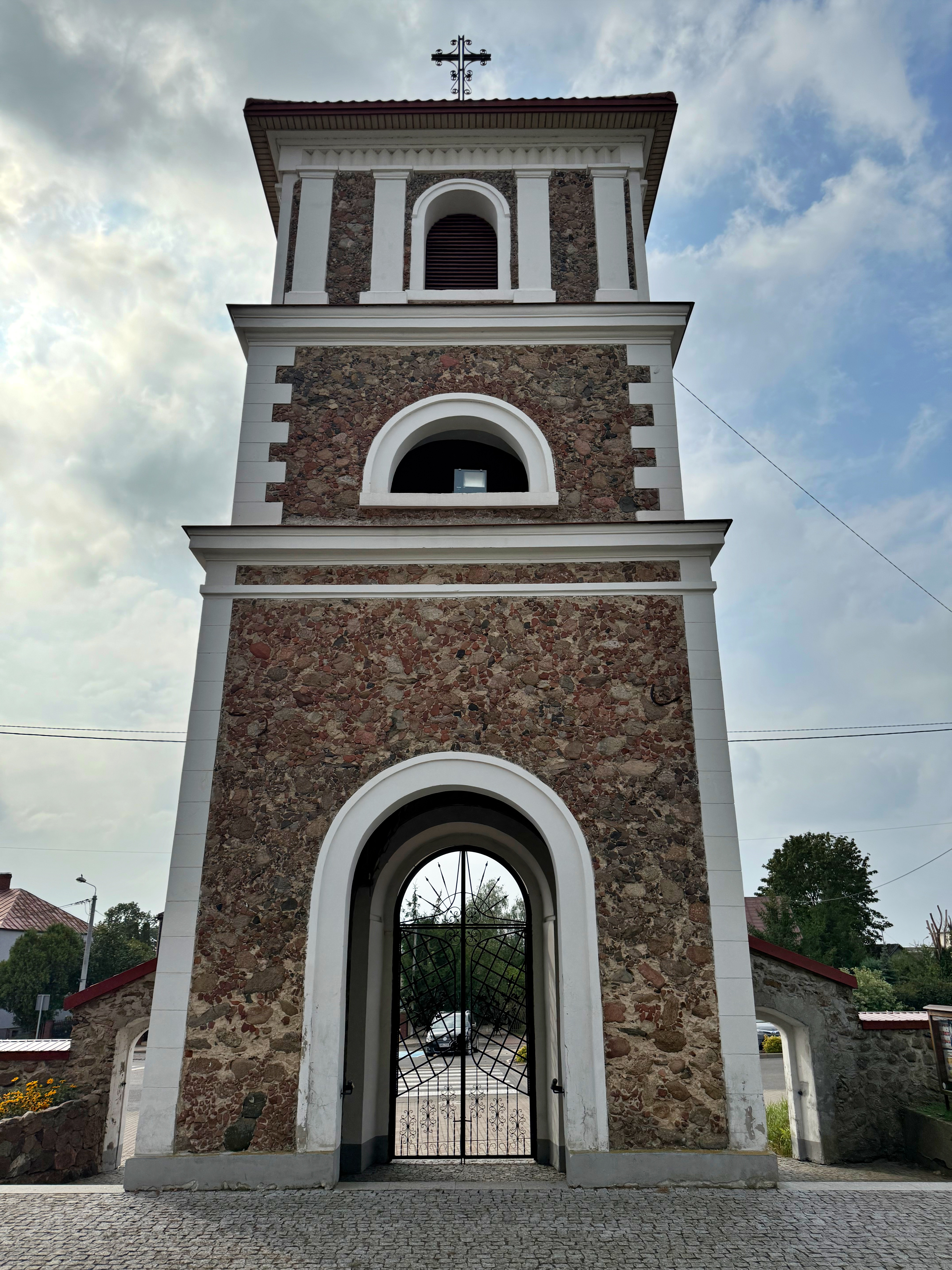
Bell tower

- Saints Peter and Paul church
- Jewish cemetery

== Sources ==
- GUS (1924). Skorowidz miejscowości Rzeczypospolitej Polskiej: opracowany na podstawie wyników pierwszego powszechnego spisu ludności z dn. 30 września 1921 r. i innych źródeł urzędowych [Index of towns and cities in the Republic of Poland: prepared on the basis of the results of the first general population census of September 30, 1921 and other official sources] (in Polish). Vol. 17: Województwo białostockie. Warsaw: Główny Urząd Statystyczny.
- Maroszek, Józef; Studniarek, Arkadiusz (2004). Dzieje Trzciannego i obszaru gminy Trzcianne w XV–XX wieku [The history of Trzcianne and the area of Gmina Trzcianne in the 15th–20th centuries] (PDF) (in Polish). Trzcianne: Agencja „Benkowski”. ISBN 83-88045-19-9.
- Gloger, Zygmunt (1873). "Dawna ziemia Bielska i jéj cząstkowa szlachta". Biblioteka Warszawska. Pismo poświęcone naukom, sztukom i przemysłowi (in Polish). Vol. III. Warsaw: Gebethner and Wolff.
