= Lipniki, Podlaskie Voivodeship =

Lipniki
- Village
- Location within Poland
- Coordinates: 53°12′00″N 22°50′00″E
- Country: Poland
- Voivodeship: Podlaskie
- County: Białystok
- Gmina: Tykocin
- Time zone: UTC+1 (CET)
  - Summer (DST): UTC+2 (CEST)
- Vehicle registration: BIA

Lipniki (Polish pronunciation: [lipˈɲikʲi]) is a village in the administrative district of Gmina Tykocin, within Białystok County, Podlaskie Voivodeship, in north-eastern Poland.

Łukasz Górnicki (1527–1603), Polish Renaissance writer and starost of Tykocin, lived and wrote many of his works in Lipniki.
