= Szafranki =

Szafranki may refer to the following places:

- Szafranki, Białystok County in Podlaskie Voivodeship (north-east Poland)
- Szafranki, Mońki County in Podlaskie Voivodeship (north-east Poland)
- Szafranki, Suwałki County in Podlaskie Voivodeship (north-east Poland)
- Szafranki, Masovian Voivodeship (east-central Poland)
- Szafranki, Warmian-Masurian Voivodeship (north Poland)
