= Słomianka =

Słomianka may refer to the following places:

- Słomianka, Białystok County in Podlaskie Voivodeship (north-east Poland)
- Słomianka, Mońki County in Podlaskie Voivodeship (north-east Poland)
- Słomianka, Sokółka County in Podlaskie Voivodeship (north-east Poland)
