= Siekierki (disambiguation) =

Siekierki is a part of the Mokotów district of Warsaw.

Siekierki may also refer to:

- Siekierki, Białystok County in Podlaskie Voivodeship (north-east Poland)
- Siekierki, Siemiatycze County in Podlaskie Voivodeship (north-east Poland)
- Siekierki, West Pomeranian Voivodeship (north-west Poland)

== See also ==
- Siekierki Bridge, Warsaw, Poland
- Siekierki Cogeneration Plant, Warsaw, Poland
