= Leśniki =

Leśniki may refer to the following places:

- Leśniki, Białystok County in Podlaskie Voivodeship (north-east Poland)
- Leśniki, Siemiatycze County in Podlaskie Voivodeship (north-east Poland)
- Leśniki, Sokółka County in Podlaskie Voivodeship (north-east Poland)
- Leśniki, Otwock County in Masovian Voivodeship (east-central Poland)
- Leśniki, Węgrów County in Masovian Voivodeship (east-central Poland)
- Leśniki, Lubusz Voivodeship (west Poland)
- Leśniki, Warmian-Masurian Voivodeship (north Poland)
- Leśniki, West Pomeranian Voivodeship (north-west Poland)
