= Kiślaki =

Kiślaki may refer to the following places in Poland:

- Kiślaki, Białystok County (north-eastern Poland)
- Kiślaki, Mońki County (north-eastern Poland)
