= Łopuchowo, Białystok County =

Łopuchowo
- Village
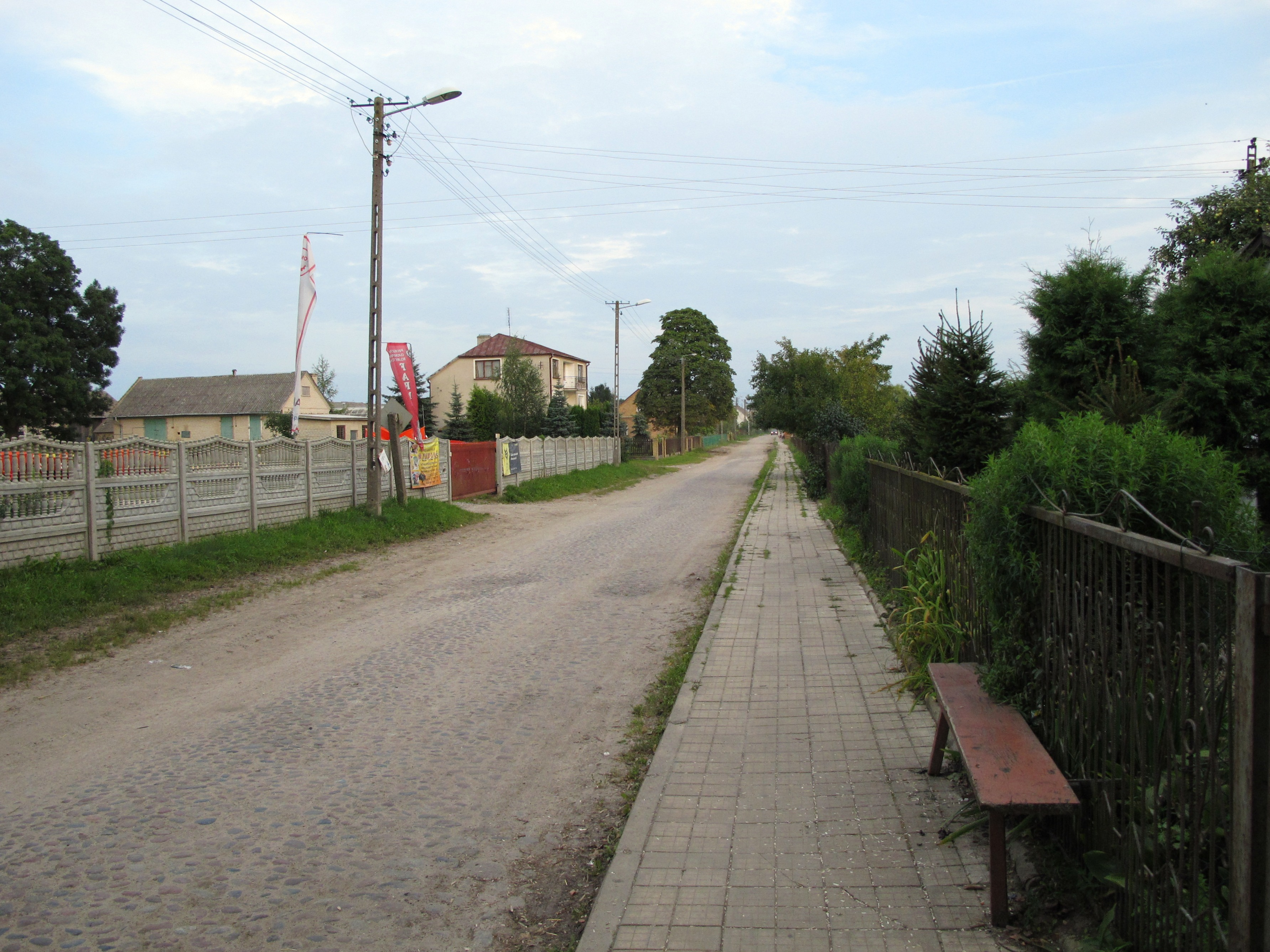

- Location within Poland
- Coordinates: 53°11′N 22°40′E
- Country: Poland
- Voivodeship: Podlaskie
- County: Białystok
- Gmina: Tykocin
- Time zone: UTC+1 (CET)
  - Summer (DST): UTC+2 (CEST)
- Area code: +48 85
- Vehicle registration: BIA

Łopuchowo [wɔpuˈxɔvɔ] is a village in the administrative district of Gmina Tykocin, within Białystok County, Podlaskie Voivodeship, in north-eastern Poland.

The site at which Tykocin's Jews were murdered and buried by the Germans on August 25, 1941 during the occupation of Poland sits in the village's outskirts. Today, a memorial stands at the location.

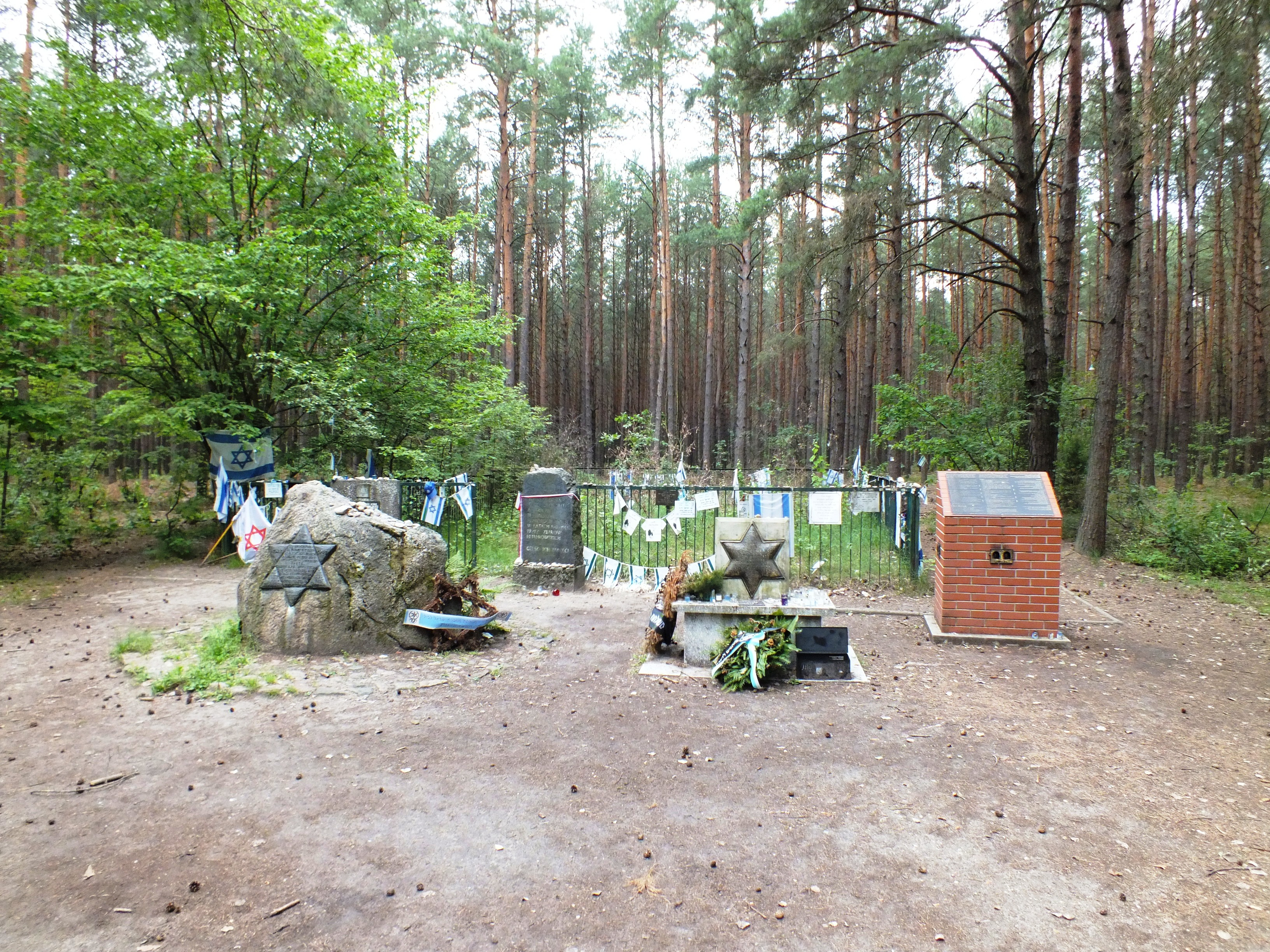
Mass grave of Jews from Tykocin, the place of the 1941 massacre carried out by Nazi Germany
