= Popowlany =

- Village
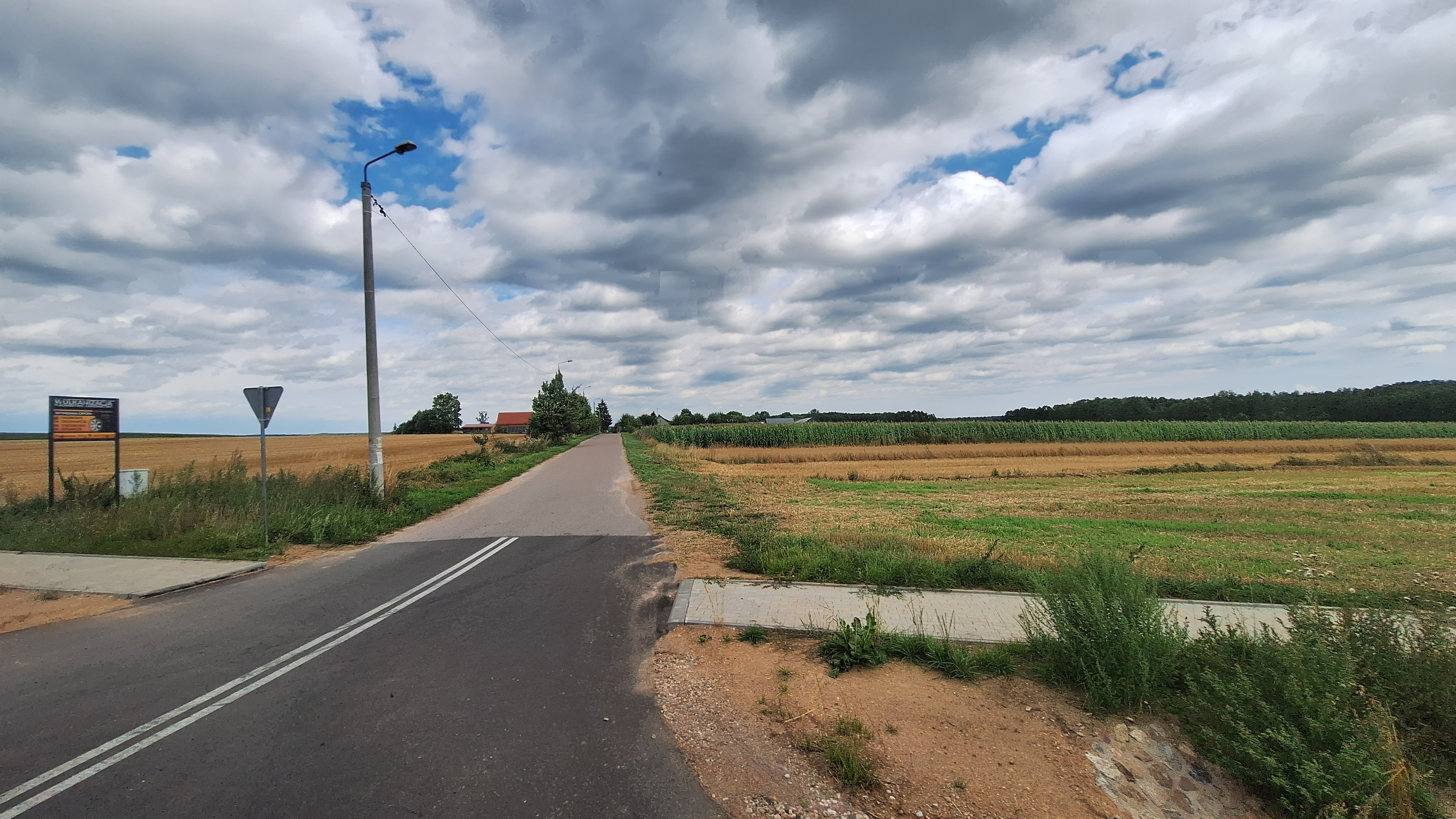

- Location within Poland
- Coordinates: 53°13′N 22°49′E
- Country: Poland
- Voivodeship: Podlaskie
- County: Białystok
- Gmina: Tykocin

Popowlany [pɔpɔˈvlanɨ] is a village located in the administrative district of Gmina Tykocin, within Białystok County, Podlaskie Voivodeship, in north-eastern Poland.
