= Stelmachowo, Podlaskie Voivodeship =

Stelmachowo
- Village
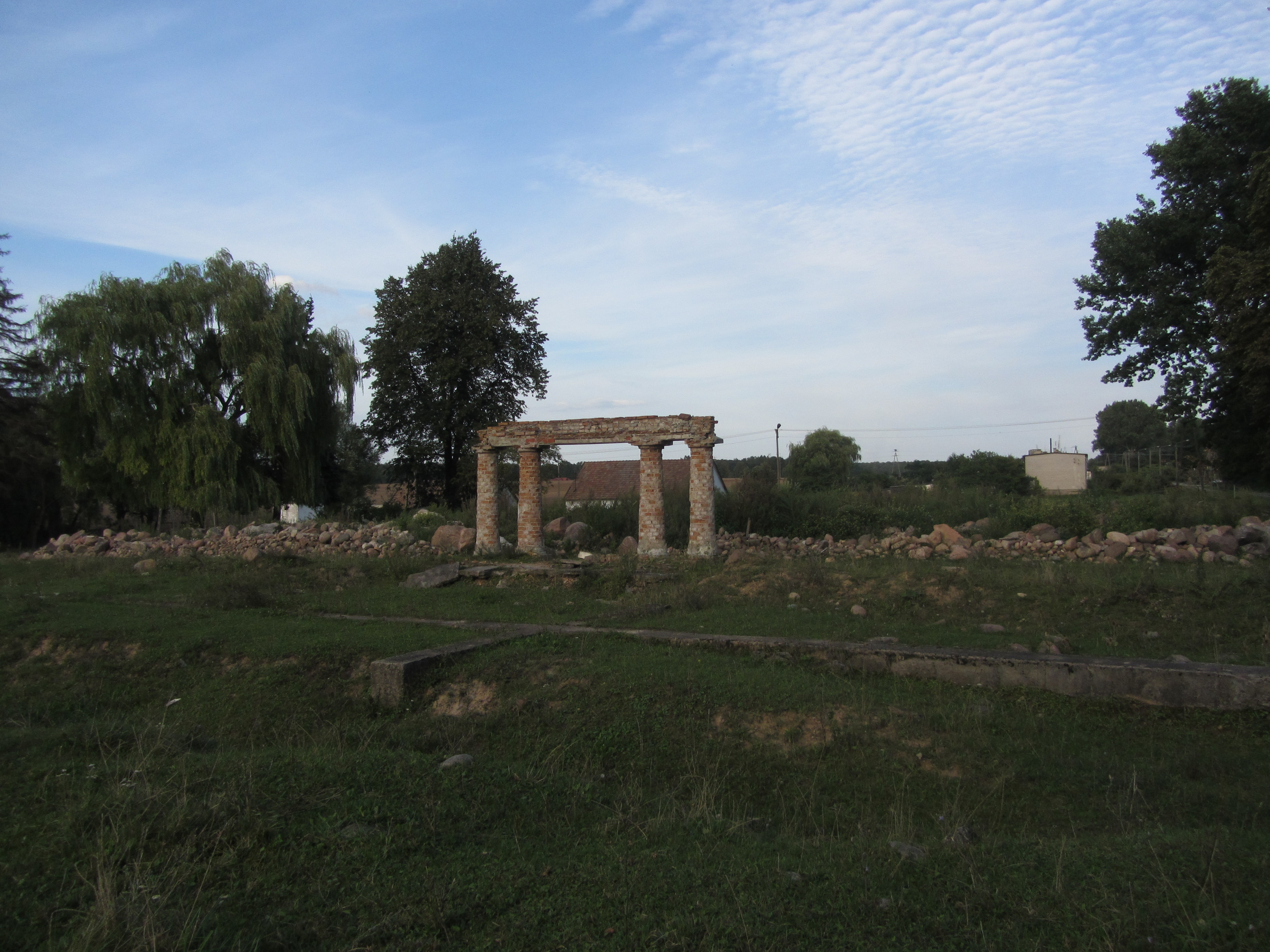
- Ruins of the Rostworowski Manor in Stelmachowo

- Location within Poland
- Coordinates: 53°9′41″N 22°44′37″E
- Country: Poland
- Voivodeship: Podlaskie
- County: Białystok
- Gmina: Tykocin

Population (approx.)
  - Total: 90

Stelmachowo [stɛlmaˈxɔvɔ] is a village in the administrative district of Gmina Tykocin, within Białystok County, Podlaskie Voivodeship, in north-eastern Poland.
