= Krosno, Podlaskie Voivodeship =

Krosno
- Village
- Location within Poland
- Coordinates: 53°14′30″N 22°43′30″E
- Country: Poland
- Voivodeship: Podlaskie
- County: Białystok
- Gmina: Tykocin

Krosno [ˈkrɔsnɔ] is a village in the administrative district of Gmina Tykocin, within Białystok County, Podlaskie Voivodeship, in north-eastern Poland.
