= Sawino =

- Village
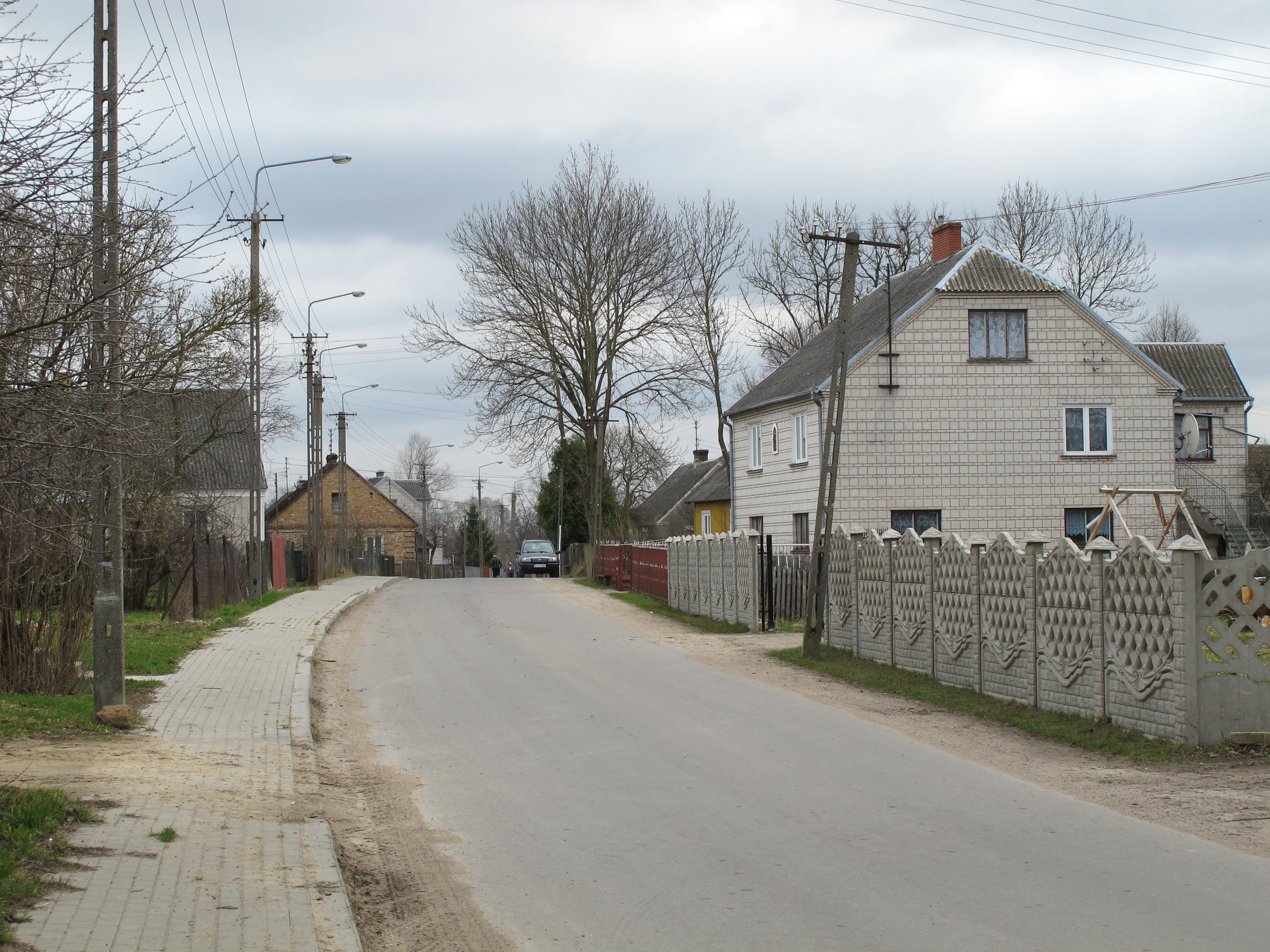
- View of the Sawino, April 2010

- Location within Poland
- Coordinates: 53°10′09″N 22°51′40″E
- Country: Poland
- Voivodeship: Podlaskie
- County: Białystok
- Gmina: Tykocin

Sawino [saˈvinɔ] is a village in the administrative district of Gmina Tykocin, within Białystok County, Podlaskie Voivodeship, in north-eastern Poland.
