= Łaziuki =

- Village
- Location within Poland
- Coordinates: 53°14′N 22°44′E
- Country: Poland
- Voivodeship: Podlaskie
- County: Białystok
- Gmina: Tykocin

Łaziuki [waˈʑuki] is a village in the administrative district of Gmina Tykocin, within Białystok County, Podlaskie Voivodeship, in north-eastern Poland.
