= Gmina Tykocin =

Gmina Tykocin Tykocin Commune
- Gmina
- Flag Coat of arms

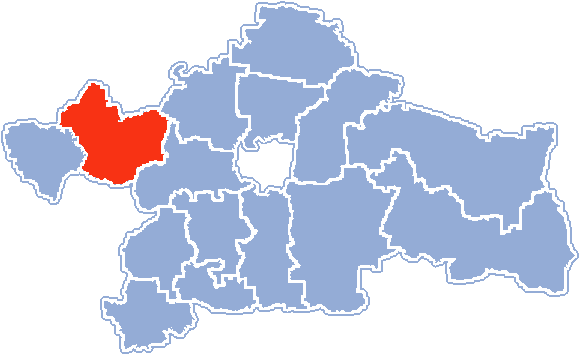
- Location within Białystok County
- Coordinates (Tykocin): 53°12′11″N 22°46′15″E
- Country: Poland
- Voivodeship: Podlaskie
- County: Białystok County
- Seat: Tykocin

Area
  - Total: 207.34 km^{2} (80.05 sq mi)

Population (2006)
  - Total: 6,477
  - Density: 31.24/km^{2} (80.91/sq mi)
  - Urban: 1,893
  - Rural: 4,584
- Website: http://www.tykocin.hg.pl

Gmina Tykocin is an urban-rural gmina (administrative district) in Białystok County, Podlaskie Voivodeship, in north-eastern Poland. Its seat is the town of Tykocin, which lies approximately 29 kilometres (18 mi) west of the regional capital Białystok.

The gmina covers an area of 207.34 square kilometres (80.1 sq mi), and as of 2006 its total population is 6,477 (out of which the population of Tykocin amounts to 1,893, and the population of the rural part of the gmina is 4,584).

== Villages ==
Apart from the town of Tykocin, Gmina Tykocin contains the villages and settlements of Bagienki, Broniszewo, Dobki, Hermany, Janin, Kapice-Lipniki, Kiermusy, Kiślaki, Krosno, Łaziuki, Łazy Duże, Łazy Małe, Leśniki, Lipniki, Łopuchowo, Nieciece, Nowe Jeżewo, Pajewo, Piaski, Popowlany, Radule, Rzędziany, Sanniki, Sawino, Siekierki, Sierki, Słomianka, Stare Jeżewo, Stare Kapice, Stelmachowo, Stelmachowo-Kolonia, Szafranki, Tatary and Żuki.

== Neighbouring gminas ==
Gmina Tykocin is bordered by the gminas of Choroszcz, Dobrzyniewo Duże, Kobylin-Borzymy, Krypno, Trzcianne and Zawady.
