= Saniki =

- Village
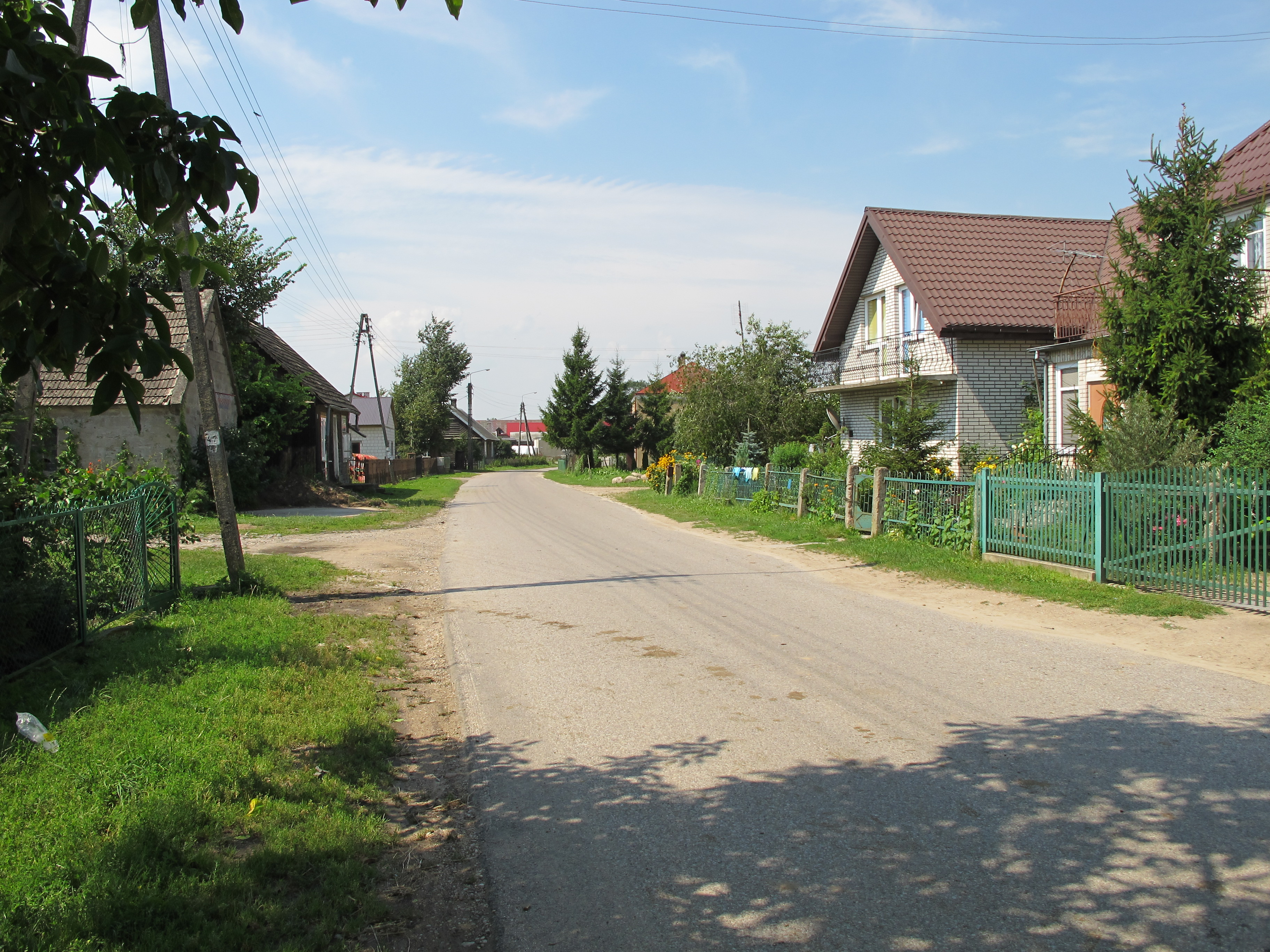
- Houses by the unpaved road in Saniki

- Location within Poland
- Coordinates: 53°11′07″N 22°48′53″E
- Country: Poland
- Voivodeship: Podlaskie
- County: Białystok
- Gmina: Tykocin

Saniki [saˈniki] is a village in the administrative district of Gmina Tykocin, within Białystok County, Podlaskie Voivodeship, in north-eastern Poland.
