= Łazy Małe, Podlaskie Voivodeship =

Łazy Małe
- Village
- Location within Poland
- Coordinates: 53°12′52″N 22°40′13″E
- Country: Poland
- Voivodeship: Podlaskie
- County: Białystok
- Gmina: Tykocin

Łazy Małe [ˈwazɨ ˈmawɛ] is a village in the administrative district of Gmina Tykocin, within Białystok County, Podlaskie Voivodeship, in north-eastern Poland.
