= Mass murders in Tykocin =

World War II mass murders in Poland

Coordinates: 53°12′11″N 22°46′15″E

The mass murders in Tykocin occurred on 25 August 1941, during World War II, where the local Jewish population of Tykocin (Poland) was killed by German Einsatzkommando.

== Background ==
The town of Tykocin was conquered by Nazi Germany during the Soviet and German invasion of Poland pursuant to their secret agreement known as the Molotov–Ribbentrop Pact. At the end of September 1939, the area was transferred by the Nazis to the Soviet Union in accordance with the German–Soviet Boundary Treaty. In June 1941, the town was taken by the Germans in Operation Barbarossa.

The Germans initially bypassed the town; local Poles affiliated with the National Democracy (Endecja) movement who prior to the war had organized boycotts of Jews prior to the war engaged in systematic looting of the Jewish homes in the town.

According to the testimony of survivor Menachem Turek, the Germans installed Jan Fibich, a local ethnic German, as mayor. Fibich, aided by Edmund Wiśniewski, prepared a list of alleged Jewish communists, which included almost all of the Jewish youth.

== Massacre ==
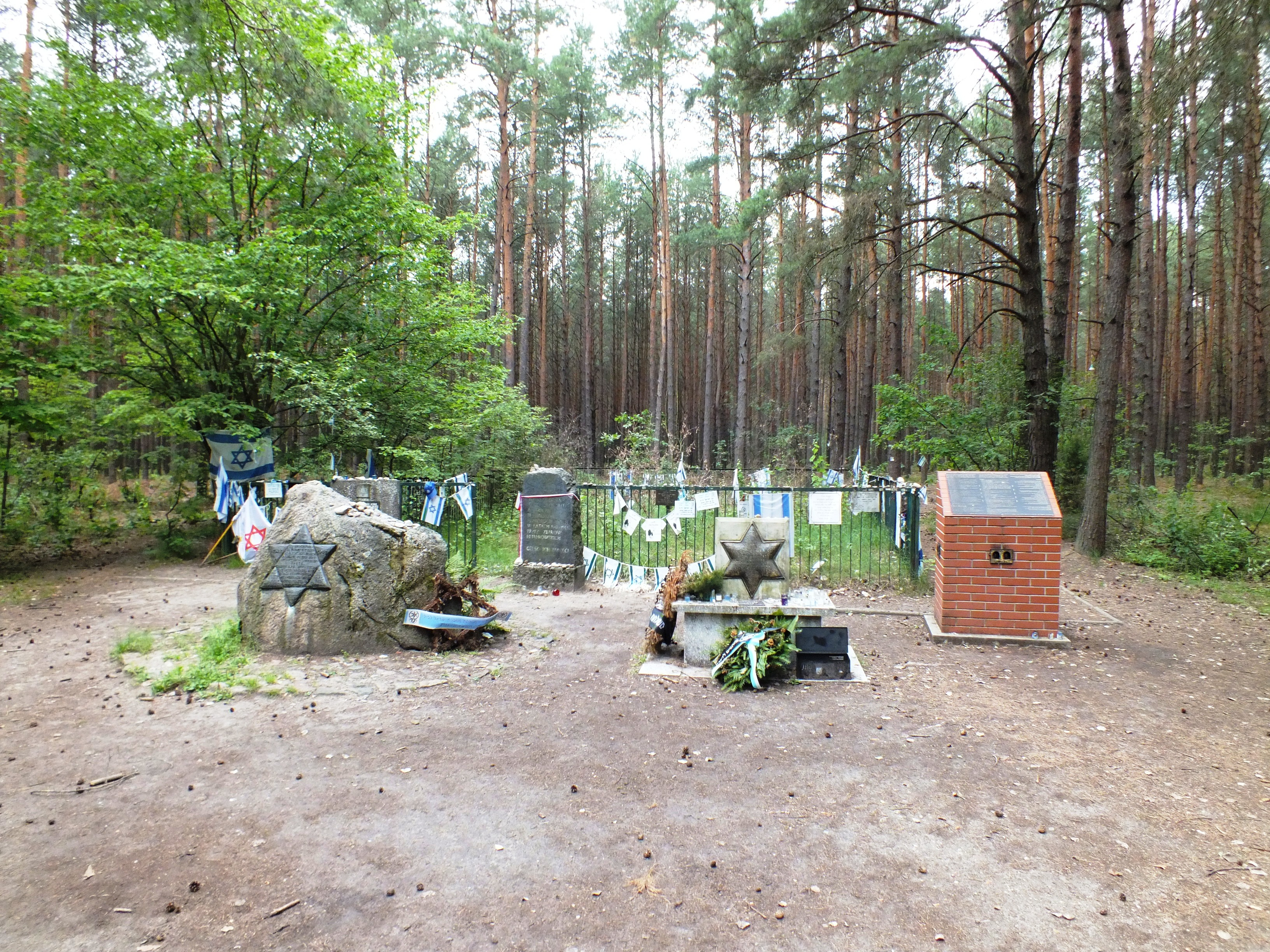
Mass grave of Jews from Tykocin - the place of the massacre in the forest near Łopuchowo. Marked mass grave and monuments commemorating the massacre.

On the morning of 24 August, the Germans announced that Jews should report the next day to the town square. At the time there were approximately 1,400 Jews in Tykocin. On 25 August the Jews were rounded up in the square by the Germans with help from Polish police. In order to placate the crowd the Germans told the Jews that they were going to be transported to Białystok Ghetto. The men were marched to a nearby village and from there taken in trucks to the pits in Łopuchowo forest, and murdered. The women and infirm were driven by truck to the pits and murdered. The old, infirm, and other people who did not show up on 25 August, some 700 in total, were driven to the pits on 26 August and shot.

In a West German investigation, a Jewish witness identified SS-Obersturmführer Hermann Schaper, who commanded SS Einsatzkommando, as the man directing the shootings.

Some 150 Jews managed to escape the massacre, however most were handed over to the Germans. Some reached Białystok Ghetto, and shared the fate of the Jews there.

== Commemoration ==
At the site of the massacre in the forest there are four monuments. The first, a communist era Polish monument, contains no reference to Jews. The second and third were erected by American Jews. The fourth, erected due to the efforts of Abraham Kapice, is in the shape of the Star of David and inscribed in Hebrew so that Israeli school children will be able to read it.

== See also ==
- Jedwabne pogrom
- Wąsosz pogrom
