= Piaski, Białystok County =

Piaski
- Village
- Location within Poland
- Coordinates: 53°08′30″N 22°47′30″E
- Country: Poland
- Voivodeship: Podlaskie
- County: Białystok
- Gmina: Tykocin
- Time zone: UTC+1 (CET)
  - Summer (DST): UTC+2 (CEST)
- Postal code: 16-080
- Vehicle registration: BIA

Piaski (Polish pronunciation: [ˈpjaskʲi]) is a village in the administrative district of Gmina Tykocin, within Białystok County, Podlaskie Voivodeship, in north-eastern Poland.
