= Kapice-Lipniki =

- Village
- Location within Poland
- Coordinates: 53°8′39″N 22°41′34″E
- Country: Poland
- Voivodeship: Podlaskie
- County: Białystok
- Gmina: Tykocin
- Population: 90

Kapice-Lipniki (Polish pronunciation: [kaˈpit͡sɛ lipˈɲikʲi]) is a village in the administrative district of Gmina Tykocin, within Białystok County, Podlaskie Voivodeship, in north-eastern Poland.
