= Hermann Schaper =

SS officer (1911–2002)

- Born: 12 August 1911
- Died: 2002 (aged 90–91); Unknown
- Military career
- Allegiance: Nazi Germany
- Branch: Schutzstaffel
- Service years: until 1945
- Rank: SS-Hauptsturmführer
- Unit: SS-Totenkopfverbände
- Commands: SS Zichenau-Schroettersburg

Hermann Schaper (August 1911 – 2002), was a German SS functionary during the Nazi era. He was a Holocaust perpetrator responsible for atrocities committed by the Einsatzgruppen in German-occupied Poland and the Soviet Union and was convicted after the war of numerous war crimes.

He is directly responsible for the murder in Jedwabne and other pogroms against Jews in the Podlachia region in 1941–1944; he never faced any punishment, however.

== SS career ==
Schaper joined the Schutzstaffel and was promoted to the rank of SS-Untersturmführer on 20 April 1935. He achieved the rank of SS-Obersturmführer on 20 April 1937. Before the 1939 invasion of Poland, Schaper worked at the SD principal offices of Nazi Germany. During the German occupation of Poland Schaper served as commander of Kommando SS Zichenau-Schröttersburg – a Nazi Einsatzgruppe, one of five such formations created in eastern Poland and composed of 500–1000 functionaries of the SS and Gestapo. Schaper operated in the Płock (renamed Schröttersburg) district administered by Count von der Groeben. His superior was SS-Sturmbannführer Hartmut Pulmer, a Gestapo chief based in Ciechanów (renamed Zichenau).

Schaper's death squad was deployed in the newly formed Bezirk Bialystok district soon after the German invasion of the Soviet Union. Himmler visited Białystok on 30 June 1941 and pronounced that more forces were needed in the area, because the massive chase after the fleeing Red Army left behind a security vacuum. On 3 July an additional formation of Schutzpolizei arrived in the city from the General Government, led by SS-Hauptsturmführer Wolfgang Birkner, veteran of Einsatzgruppe IV from the Polish Campaign. The relief unit, called Kommando Bialystok, was sent in by SS-Obersturmbannführer Eberhard Schöngarth on orders from the Reich Security Main Office (RSHA), due to reports of Soviet guerrilla activity in the area with Jews being “of course” immediately suspected of helping them. On 10 July 1941 Schaper's Einsatzgruppe was subdivided into dozens of smaller commandos (Einsatzkommandos) numbering from several to several scores of people whose mission was to kill Jews, alleged communists and Soviet NKVD collaborators in captured territories often far behind the advancing German front. The entire Einsatzgruppe employed the same, systematic method of mass killing in many Polish villages (sometimes in the role of facilitating violence by civilians) and towns in the vicinity of Białystok. Schaper's murderous rampage south-east of East Prussia included Wizna (end of June), Wąsosz (5 July), Radziłów (7 July), Jedwabne (10 July), Łomża (early August), Tykocin (22–25 August), Rutki (4 September), Piątnica, Zambrów as well as other locations.

== Post-war trials ==
At the beginning of the 1960s, the war crimes committed by Schaper were investigated by the German Judicial Centre for Prosecuting Nazi Crimes in Ludwigsburg. The prosecutors had called a key witness, the German Kreiskommissar in Łomża, who named the Gestapo paramilitary Einsatzgruppe B under SS-Obersturmführer Hermann Schaper in the course of Birkner's investigation. Schaper was charged in 1964 with personally directing the Einsatzkommando responsible for the mass killing of Jews in the city. Two witnesses from Israel – Chaja Finkelstein from Radziłów and Izchak Feler from Tykocin – recognized Hermann Schaper from photographs as the one responsible also for the pogrom in Radziłów on 7 July 1941, as well as the mass murders in Tykocin of 25 August 1941. The methods used by Schaper's death squad in these massacres were identical to those employed in Jedwabne (a few kilometers distance) only three days later. Schaper denied the charges, and the Germans found the evidence insufficient to prosecute him at that time. He lied to interrogators that in 1941 he had been a truck driver and used false names. Legal proceedings against him were terminated on 2 September 1965 despite his positive identification by the courts.

He was retried in Germany in 1976 for other crimes against Poles and Jews and was sentenced to six years in prison, however following an appeal this was overturned and his health was declared too fragile for a new trial. Schaper was convicted along with Franz Hartmann, Hans Doermage, Kurt Baresel also from the Gestapo station at Ciechanów for their complicity in holocaust-related crimes. Another defendant, Ernst Schardt was acquitted. Charges against Otto Roehr were dropped.

Schaper died of old age in his nineties. According to statement received by the Polish IPN from German prosecution, the documentation of his trial is no longer available and was most likely destroyed after the case was terminated.

== Notes and references ==
- Hauptsturmführer Hermann Schaper - dowódca speckomanda SS Ciechanów-Płock Fotogaleria miasta Płocka
- Lessons and Legacies VII: The Holocaust in International Perspective By Dagmar Herzog
- (in Polish) Artykuły, Polemiki, Listy Czytelników; 2000–2002, Rzeczpospolita
