= Łazy Duże, Podlaskie Voivodeship =

Łazy Duże
- Village
- Location within Poland
- Coordinates: 53°12′49″N 22°39′37″E
- Country: Poland
- Voivodeship: Podlaskie
- County: Białystok
- Gmina: Tykocin
- Population: 40

Łazy Duże [ˈwazɨ ˈduʐɛ] is a village in the administrative district of Gmina Tykocin, within Białystok County, Podlaskie Voivodeship, in north-eastern Poland.
