= Kapice Stare =

- Village
- Location within Poland
- Coordinates: 53°08′27″N 22°41′23″E
- Country: Poland
- Voivodeship: Podlaskie
- County: Białystok
- Gmina: Tykocin
- Population: 140

Kapice Stare [ˈstarɛ kaˈpit͡sɛ] is a village in the administrative district of Gmina Tykocin, within Białystok County, Podlaskie Voivodeship, in north-eastern Poland.
