= Janin, Podlaskie Voivodeship =

Janin
- Village
- Location within Poland
- Coordinates: 53°12′30″N 22°40′30″E
- Country: Poland
- Voivodeship: Podlaskie
- County: Białystok
- Gmina: Tykocin

Janin (Polish pronunciation: [ˈjanin]) is a village in the administrative district of Gmina Tykocin, within Białystok County, Podlaskie Voivodeship, in north-eastern Poland.
