= Łukasz Górnicki =

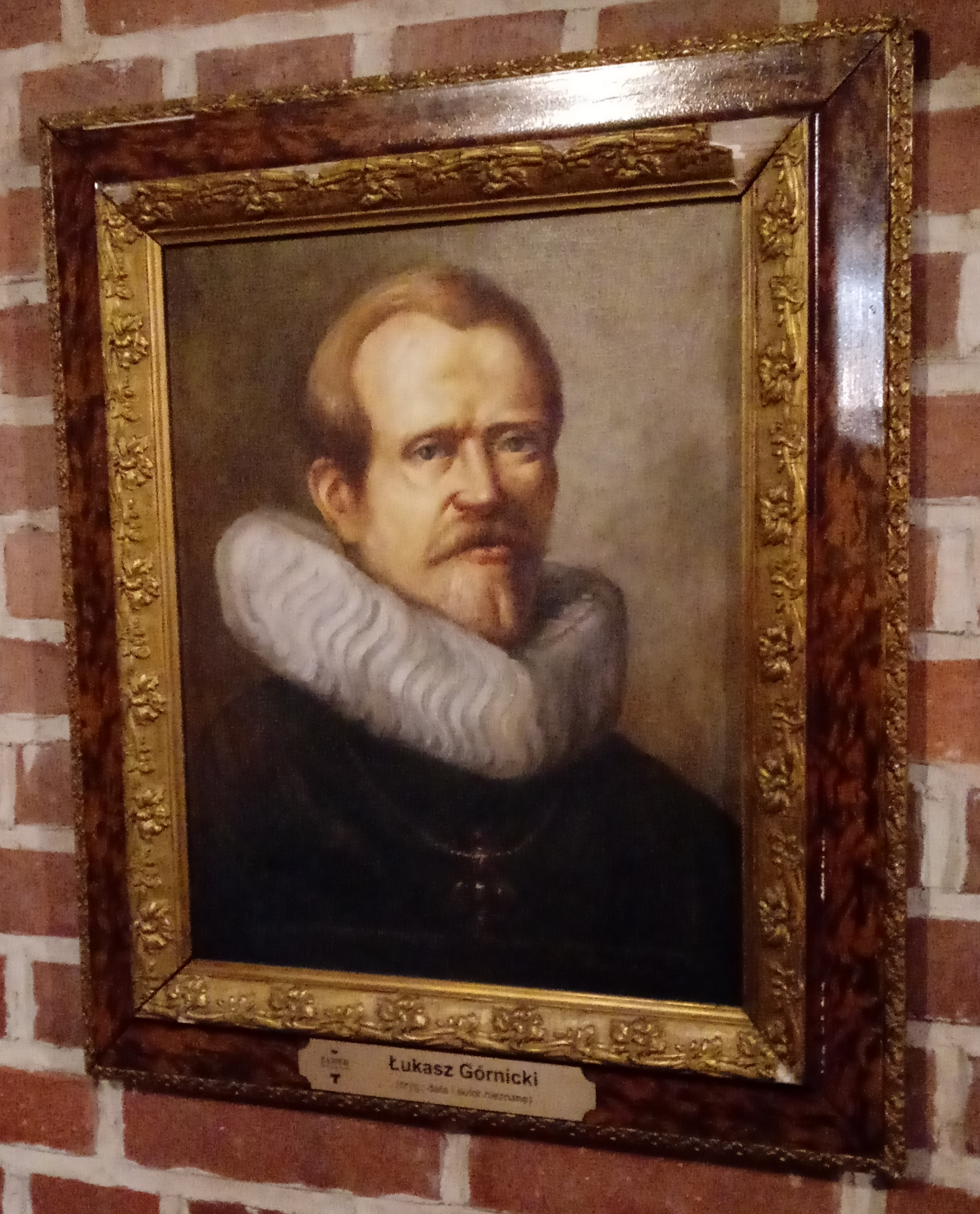
Portrait of Górnicki at Tykocin Castle

Łukasz Górnicki (1527 in Oświęcim – 22 July 1603 in Lipniki by Tykocin), was a Polish Renaissance, poet, humanist, political commentator as well as secretary and chancellor of king Sigismund Augustus of Poland. His family used Ogończyk coat of arms.

He wrote a number of works both poetic and political. Górnicki is most famous for his Dworzanin Polski (The Polish Courtier), an adaptation of Baldassare Castiglione's Book of the Courtier (Il cortegiano).

== Life ==
=== Youth and education ===
Łukasz Górnicki was born in Oświęcim. He was the son of Marcin Góra and Anna Gąsiorkówna, poor townspeople from Bochnia. Górnicki began his education there. His early life was heavily influenced by his uncle Stanisław Gąsiorek, called Anserinu, a cleric at and director of the royal chapel on Wawel, as well as author of Polish patriotic verses and composer. Stanisław took an interest in his nephew and brought him to Kraków in 1538, seeing to the young man's studies and court career, and eventually declared Górnicki his heir.

The exact contours of Górnicki's education are uncertain, though it can be said that he never entered the Kraków Academy.

=== At the court of Sigismund August ===
Górnicki worked at court of king Sigismund August from his youth until his death. In this time he had ample opportunity to encounter the courtly life surrounding the king. In 1548 he went on bishop Filip Padniewski's diplomatic mission to Transylvania. From 1552 he worked in the royal chancery under the direction of the chancellor Jan Przerembski. In 1552 Górnicki travelled with Przerembski in the king's service Gdańsk, Kaliningrad, and Lithuania.

In this period he took low orders, and received a few benefices as a result. Having gained some financial stability from these benefices and from his uncle's will, Górnicki set off for Italy for two years in 1557. Resident in Padua, he studied law at the university there. He returned to Poland in February 1559.

=== Dworzanin Polski ===
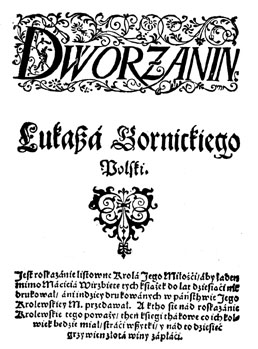
Title page of Dworzanin polski

From 1559 to mid-1565, Górnicki worked on a translation and adaptation of Baldassare Castiglione's Book of the Courtier (Il cortegiano). This was published in Kraków as Dworzanin polski (lit. 'Polish Courtier') in 1566 and was dedicated to King Sigismund August. Górnicki followed Castiglione's model, but changed it to match the Polish situation. He moved the discussion at the base of the text from the court of Guidobaldo da Montefeltro in Urbino in 1507 to the residence of Bishop Samuel Maciejowski in Prądnik Biały near Kraków in 1549. In that conversation the participants discuss the ideal courtier, a nonchalant man of good family, who brings together good manners and breeding with honor and education. The discussants in Górnicki's version were: Wojciech Kryski, Stanisław Maciejowski, Andrzej Kostka, Aleksander Myszkowski, Jan Dreśniak, Stanisław Wapowski, Stanisław Bojanowski and Stanisław Lupa Podlodowski (father-in-law of Jan Kochanowski).

For this work Górnicki received a noble title from King Sigismund, as well as the Ogończyk coat of arms in 1561.

=== Later life ===
Between 1574 and 1579 Górnicki married Barbara Broniewska, his junior by almost 30 years, daughter of Stanisław Broniowski, Master of the Horse in Przemyśl.

Łukasz Górnicki died in Lipniki pod Tykocinem on 22 July 1603. He was buried in Tykocin in the Bernardine church on the island of Narew.

== Works ==
- Rozmowa O Elekcyey, o Wolności, o Prawie y obyczaiach Polskich Podczas Electiey Krola Iego Mci Zygmunta III czyniona [...]. Kraków, 1616.
- Unterredung von der Wahl, Freyheit, Gesetzen und Sitten der Pohlen [...]. Wrocław; Leipzig, 1753.
- Lucas Gornicki, Starosten von Tykocin und Wasilkow, Unterredung von der Wahl, Freyheit, Gesetzen und Sitten der Pohlen, zur Zeit der Wahl Sigismund des Dritten verfertiget und ohnlängst nach verbesserter alten pohlnischen Schreibart aufs neue herausgegeben durch J.Z.R.K. Nunmehro [...] ins Deutsche übersetzet und mit [...] dem Leben des Auctoris versehen von Christian Gottlieb Friesen. Wrocław, 1762.
- Clarissimi Viri Lucae Gornickij […] Actio Adversus Demetrium Et Pro Demetrio, Latine Versa […] = Sławnego Męża Łukasza Gornickiego […] Sprawa Przeciw Dymitrowi Y Za Dymitrem. Wilno, 1788.
- Rozmowa o Elekcyi, o Wolności, o Prawie, y obyczaiach Polskich. Podczas Elekcyi Króla Jego Mći Zygmunta III czyniona. Pisana przez Łukasza Gornickiego [...]. Teraz nowo wydana y w stylu Staro-Polskim nieco poprawiona przez J. Z. R. K.. Warsaw, 1750-1795.
- Nowy Karakter Polski Z Drukarnie Lazarzowey: Y Orthographia Polska: Iana Kochanowskiego, [...] Lukasza Gornickie[go], [...] Iana Ianuszowskiego, Kraków 1594. (Co-authored with Jan Kochanowski and Jan Januszowski.)

== Bibliography ==
- Bodniak, Stanisław. Karta z bibljotekarskich i starościńskich zajęć Górnickiego. Kraków, 1928.
- Czarnik, Bronisław. Żywot Łukasza Górnickiego. Lwów, 1883.
- Kozielewski, Ignacy. Łukasz Górnicki: studium historyczno-literackie. Lwów, 1929.
- Lichański, Jakub Zdzisław. Łukasz Górnicki. Wrocław, 1982.
- Lichański, Jakub Zdzisław. Łukasz Górnicki: sarmacki Castiglione. Warsaw, 1998.
- Lowenfeld, Rafał. Łukasz Górnicki, jego życie i dzieła: przyczynek do dziejów humanizmu w Polsce. Warsaw, 1884.
- Noworolskiej, B., and W. Steca. Łukasz Górnicki i jego czasy. Białystok, 1993.
- Salwa, P., ed. Łukasz Górnicki i jego włoskie inspiracje. Warsaw, 2005.
- Pollak, Roman. "Górnicki Łukasz (1527-1603)." In Polski Słownik Biograficzny, vol. 8, part. 3. Wrocław, 1960.
