= Kiermusy =

- Village
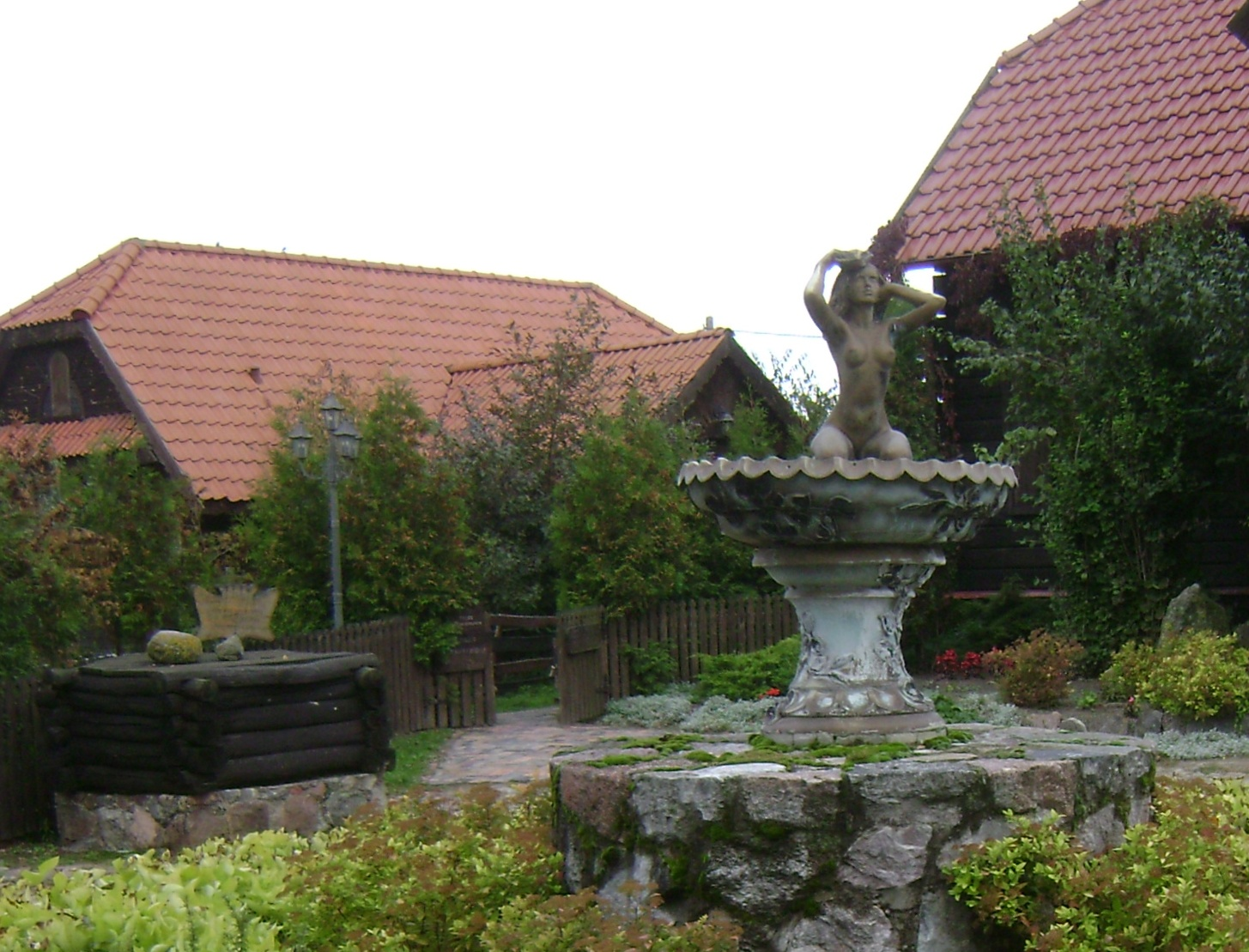

- Location within Poland
- Coordinates: 53°12′17″N 22°42′27″E
- Country: Poland
- Voivodeship: Podlaskie
- County: Białystok
- Gmina: Tykocin

Kiermusy [kʲɛrˈmusɨ] is a village in the administrative district of Gmina Tykocin, within Białystok County, Podlaskie Voivodeship, in north-eastern Poland.
