= Jeżewo Nowe =

- Village
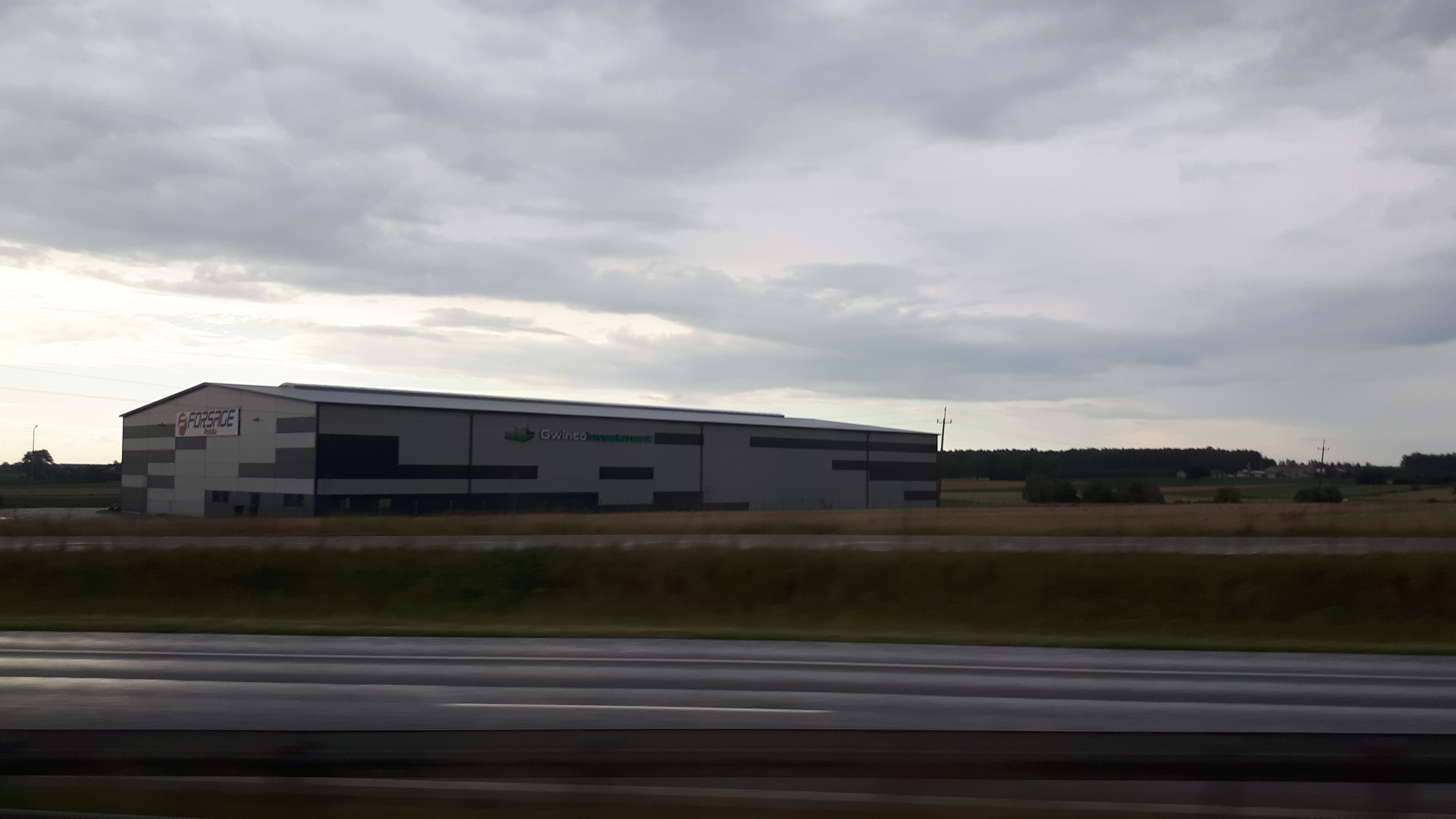

- Location within Poland
- Coordinates: 53°8′22″N 22°42′46″E
- Country: Poland
- Voivodeship: Podlaskie
- County: Białystok
- Gmina: Tykocin
- Population: 100

Jeżewo Nowe [jɛˈʐɛvɔ ˈnɔvɛ] is a village in the administrative district of Gmina Tykocin within Białystok County, Podlaskie Voivodeship in north-eastern Poland.
