= Nieciece =

- Village
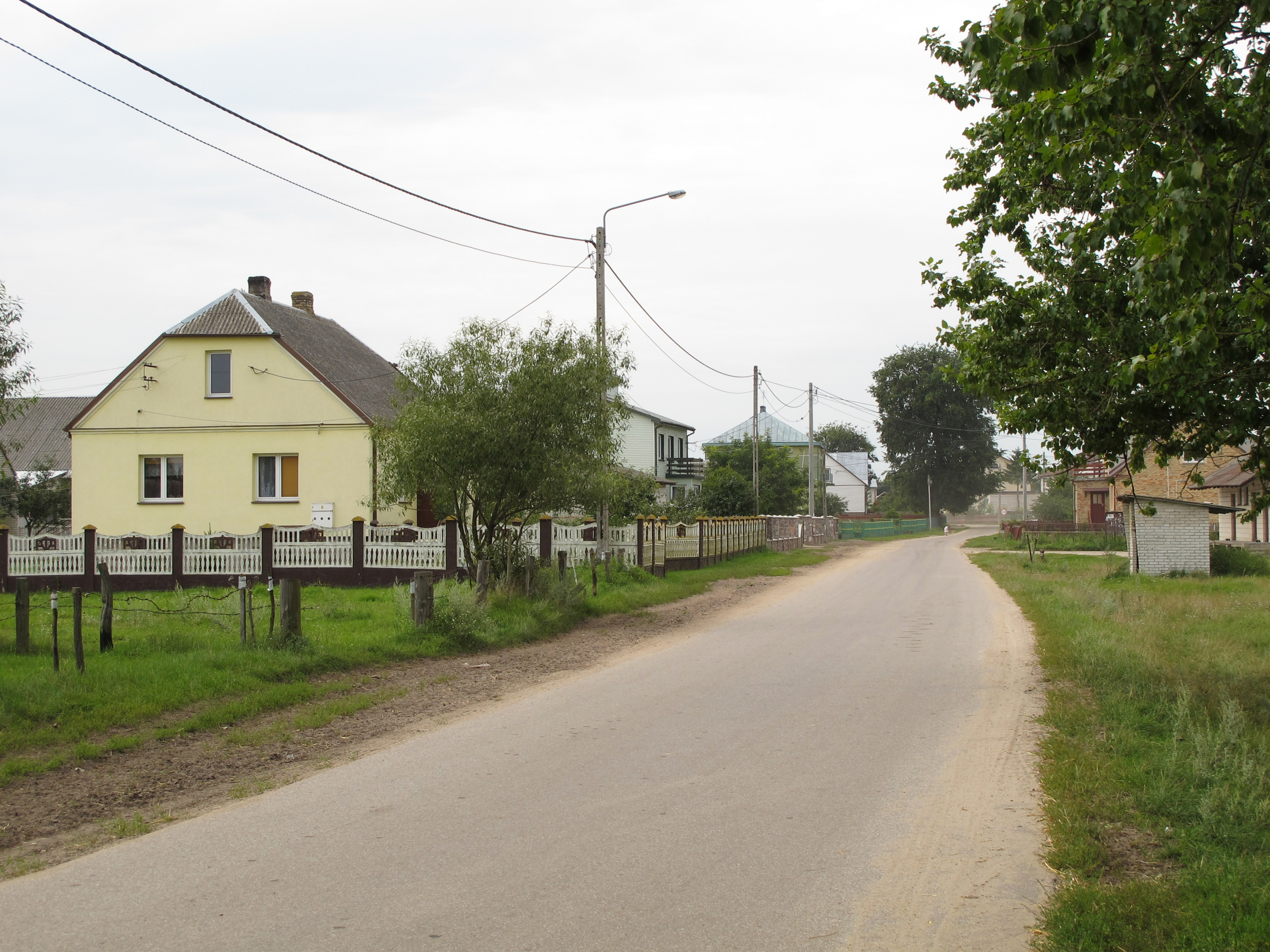

- Location within Poland
- Coordinates: 53°13′N 22°41′E
- Country: Poland
- Voivodeship: Podlaskie
- County: Białystok
- Gmina: Tykocin

Nieciece [ɲɛˈt͡ɕɛt͡sɛ] is a village in the administrative district of Gmina Tykocin, within Białystok County, Podlaskie Voivodeship, in north-eastern Poland.
