= Broniszewo, Podlaskie Voivodeship =

Broniszewo
- Village
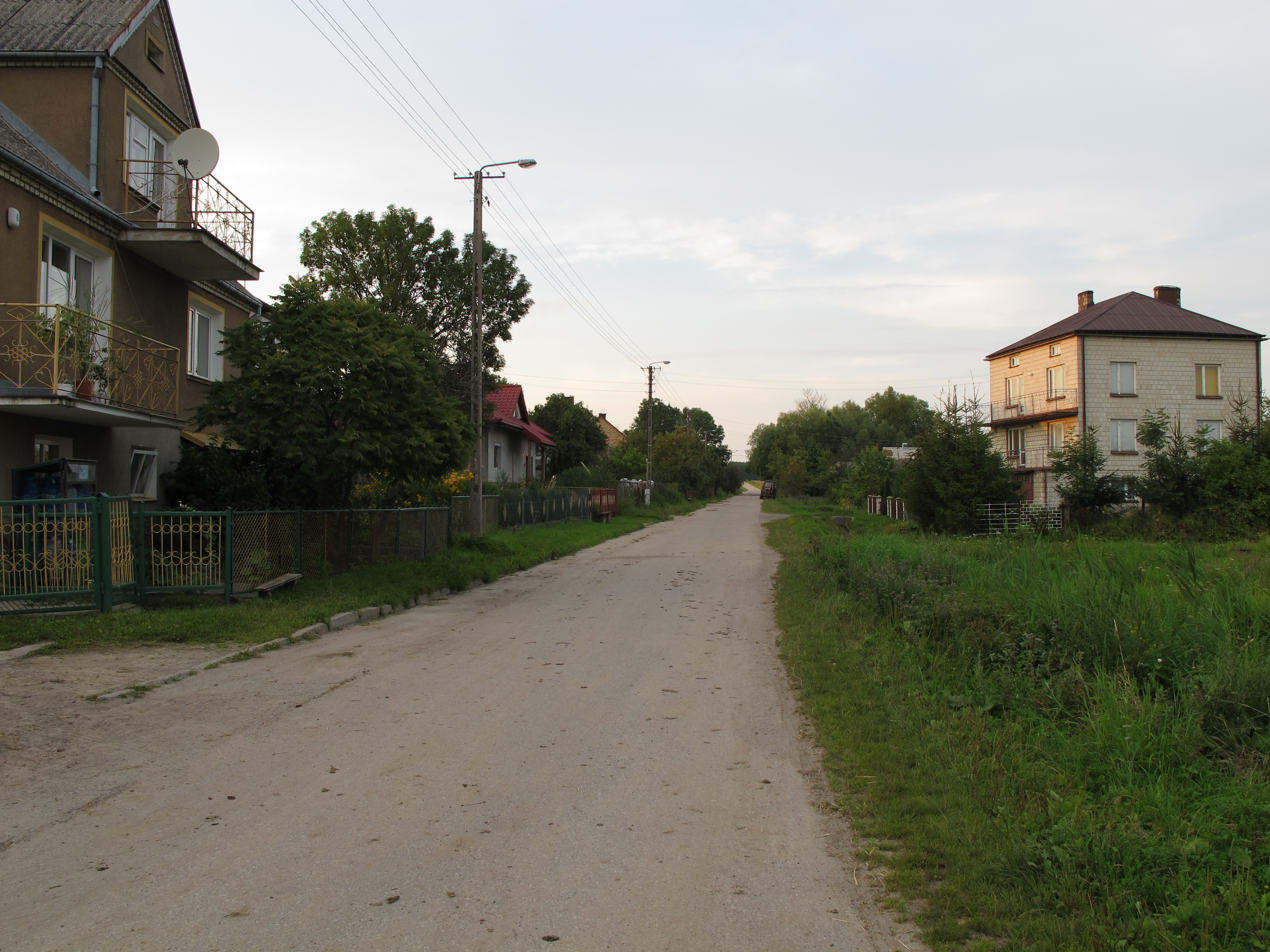

- Location within Poland
- Coordinates: 53°9′2″N 22°45′14″E
- Country: Poland
- Voivodeship: Podlaskie
- County: Białystok
- Gmina: Tykocin
- Population: 160

Broniszewo [brɔniˈʂɛvɔ] is a village in the administrative district of Gmina Tykocin, within Białystok County, Podlaskie Voivodeship, in north-eastern Poland.
