= Leśniki, Białystok County =

Leśniki
- Village
- Location within Poland
- Coordinates: 53°9′36″N 22°48′0″E
- Country: Poland
- Voivodeship: Podlaskie
- County: Białystok
- Gmina: Tykocin
- Elevation: 140 m (460 ft)
- Population (approx.): 170

Leśniki [lɛɕˈniki] is a village in the administrative district of Gmina Tykocin, within Białystok County, Podlaskie Voivodeship, in north-eastern Poland.
