= Siekierki, Białystok County =

Siekierki
- Village
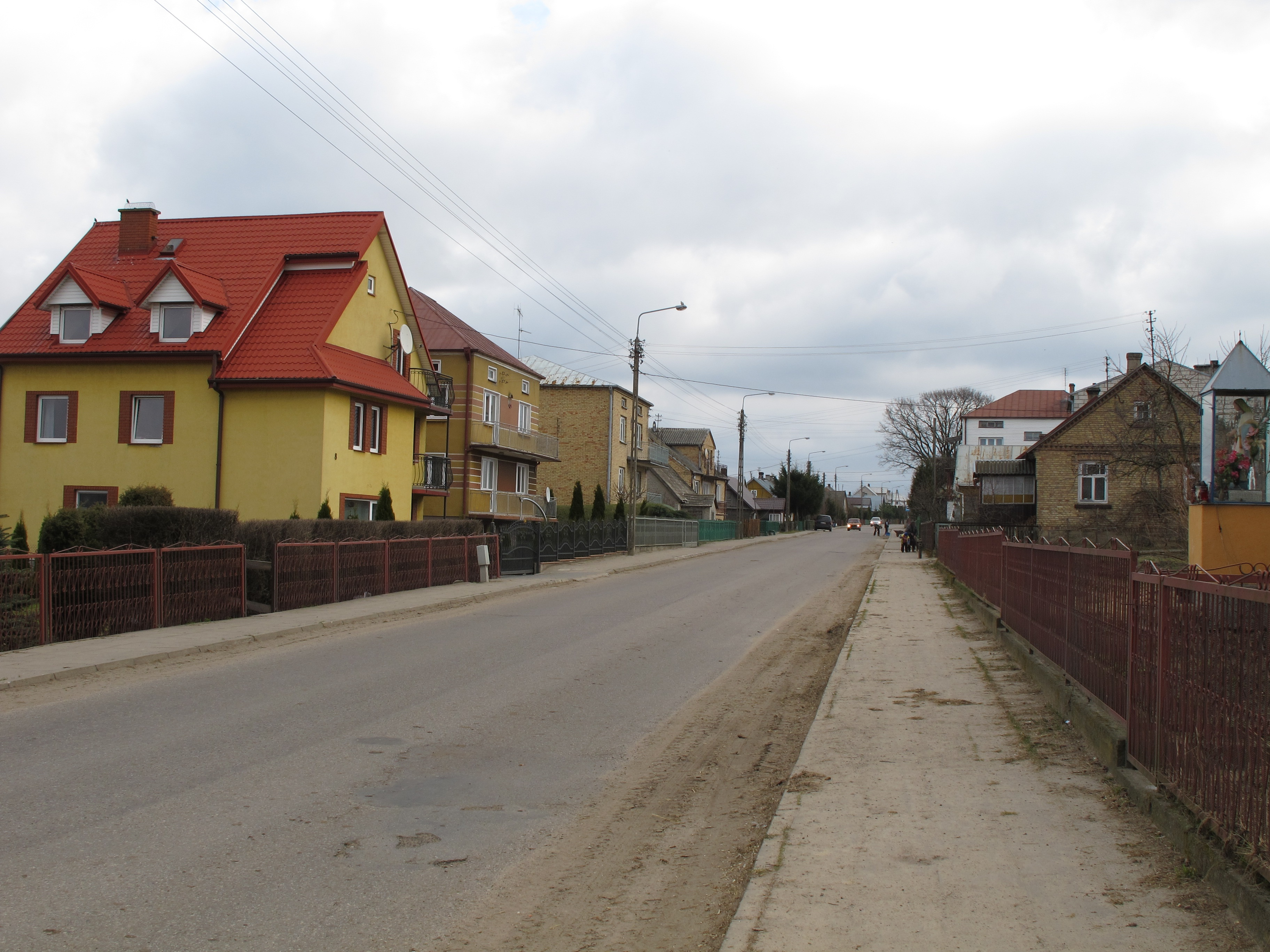

- Location within Poland
- Coordinates: 53°11′40″N 22°53′36″E
- Country: Poland
- Voivodeship: Podlaskie
- County: Białystok
- Gmina: Tykocin

Siekierki [ɕɛˈkʲɛrki] is a village in the administrative district of Gmina Tykocin, within Białystok County, Podlaskie Voivodeship, in north-eastern Poland.
