= Tykocin =

Town in Podlaskie Voivodeship, Poland

- Tykocin — from top left: Great Synagogue, Bernardine monastery, Port Kultury cultural centre, Holy Trinity Church, Narew River at sunset, historic wooden house on 11 Listopada Street, historic buildings on Kaczorowska Street, storks on their nest, wooden house on Kaczorowska Street, Alumnat, Talmudic House (Small Synagogue), Royal Castle, bridge over the Narew River, and Stefan Czarniecki Monument

- Flag Coat of arms

- Location within Poland
- Coordinates: 53°12′23″N 22°46′26″E
- Country: Poland
- Voivodeship: Podlaskie
- County: Białystok
- Gmina: Tykocin
- Established: 11th century
- Town rights: 1425; restored 1993

Government
  - Mayor: Mariusz Dudziński

Area
  - Total: 28.96 km^{2} (11.18 sq mi)

Population (1 January 2024)
  - Total: 1,844
  - Density: 63.67/km^{2} (164.9/sq mi)
- Time zone: UTC+1 (CET)
  - Summer (DST): UTC+2 (CEST)
- Postal code: 16-080
- Area code: +48 85
- Car plates: BIA
- Website: http://umtykocin.pl/

Historic Monument of Poland
- Designated: 2021-04-19
- Reference no.: Dz. U. z 2021 r. poz. 768

Tykocin ([tɨˈkɔt͡ɕin]; Yiddish: טיקטין, romanized: Tiktin; historically also Tykocien) is a small town in north-eastern Poland, located on the Narew river in Białystok County, Podlaskie Voivodeship. It is the seat of Gmina Tykocin. The town had 1,844 inhabitants as of 1 January 2024. Tykocin is one of the oldest towns in the region. Its historic centre, which preserves the traditional urban layout and traces of the former Jewish quarter, has been designated a Historic Monument of Poland.

Historically, Tykocin lay on the borderland between Masovia and Podlachia. It was initially a private town and later a royal town in the Bielsk Land of the historic Podlaskie Voivodeship.

== History ==
=== Middle Ages ===
The origins of Tykocin are connected with a medieval Masovian stronghold located about 3 km (1.9 mi) south of the present town, near the village of Sierki. From the 11th to the 14th century it was a castellany-type stronghold with an adjacent settlement.

Tykocin developed at a crossing of the Narew on a trade route linking Polotsk and Vilnius with Poznań and Kraków. The settlement grew on the frontier between Masovia and the Grand Duchy of Lithuania, benefiting from both settlement from Masovia and expanding trade between the Crown of the Kingdom of Poland and Lithuania.

Tykocin initially belonged to the Wizna Land. It received city rights under Chełmno law from Duke Janusz I of Warsaw in 1425. Piotr of Gumowo became the first town vogt. Several months later, the settlement passed to the Grand Duchy of Lithuania under King Władysław II Jagiełło. In around 1433 Duke Sigismund Kęstutaitis granted the town and surrounding villages to Jonas Goštautas, and Tykocin became an important seat of the Lithuanian Goštautai noble family.

=== Early modern era ===
Following the childless death of the last male member of the Goštautai family in 1542, the Tykocin estate passed to the Polish–Lithuanian monarch. Under King and Grand Duke Sigismund II Augustus, the medieval stronghold was remodelled into a Renaissance castle. Sigismund II placed an arsenal, a library, a treasury and the Crown Archives in the castle. Tykocin was the largest lowland fortress in Poland, and the arsenal was one of the largest in Poland. Tykocin subsequently became a royal town of the Kingdom of Poland, located within the Podlaskie Voivodeship in the Lesser Poland Province. In 1572, Polish Renaissance writer Łukasz Górnicki was appointed starost of Tykocin by Sigismund II Augustus. Following the king's death in nearby Knyszyn, a local apothecary embalmed his body, which remained in Tykocin for over a year.

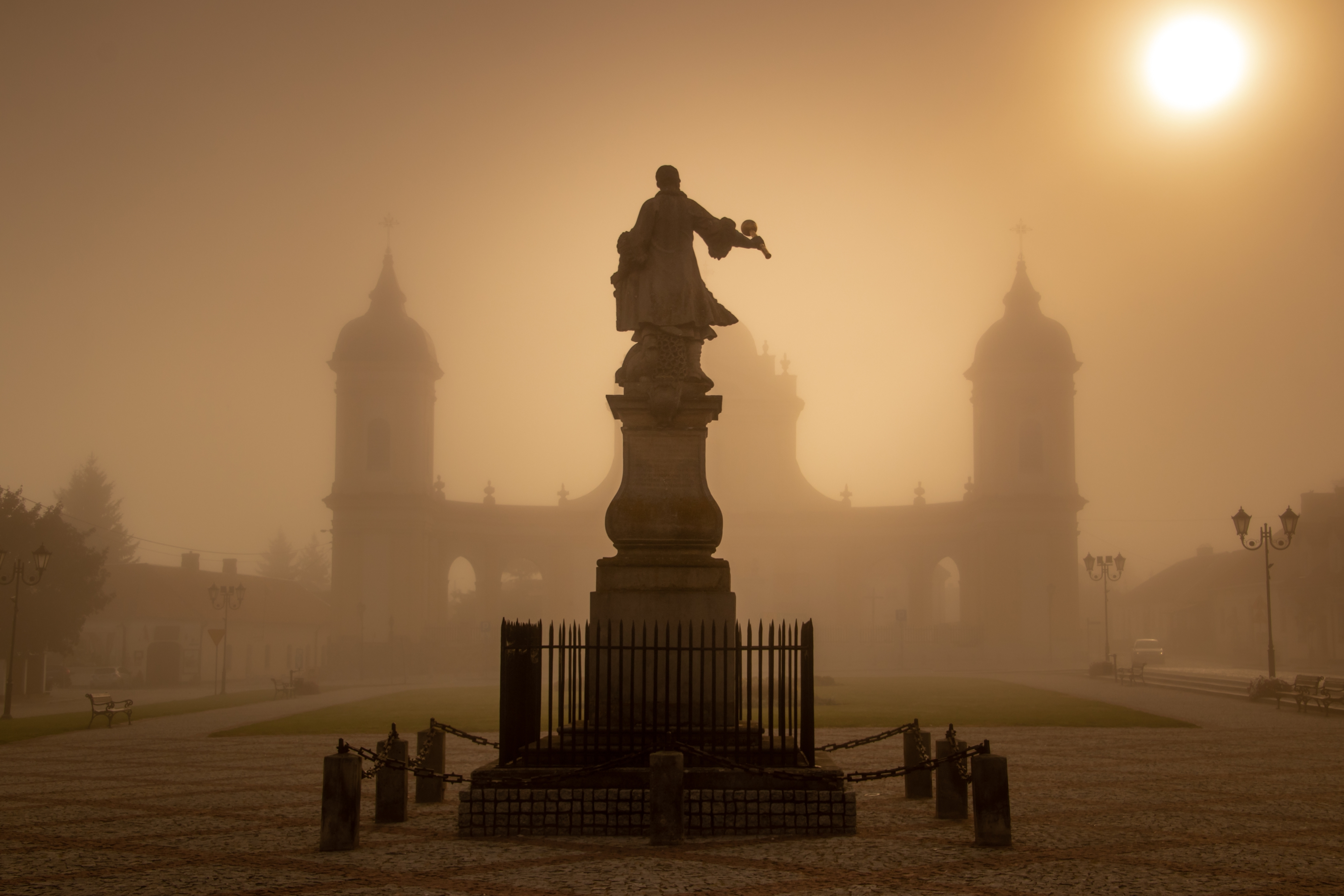
Statue of hetman Stefan Czarniecki with the Baroque Holy Trinity Church in background

In the 16th and 17th centuries, Tykocin was granted new privileges by kings Stephen Báthory and Władysław IV Vasa. Krzysztof Wiesiołowski, starost of Tykocin, founded a hospital and shelter for injured and disabled knights, one of the oldest of its kind in Europe. Later on, the town was awarded to Hetman Stefan Czarniecki for his military service during the Swedish invasion of Poland in 1661. Afterwards, through the marriage of Czarniecki's daughters, it passed to the Branicki (Gryf coat-of-arms) family. The Branickis made Tykocin the centre of their Tykocin estate. In the 18th century, after fires and destruction connected with the wars of succession, the town was substantially rebuilt in the Baroque style.

It was in Tykocin that, in 1705, King Augustus II the Strong established the Order of the White Eagle, the highest and oldest Polish order.

Most of Tykocin's best-known landmarks date from this period, including the Holy Trinity Church, the monasteries of the Congregation of the Mission and the Bernardines, the former military hospital, the synagogue and the monument to hetman Stefan Czarniecki.

=== Jewish community ===
The first Jewish settlers arrived in Tykocin in 1522 under a privilege granted by Albertas Goštautas. Ten Jews from Grodno were permitted to settle in the Kaczorowo district, establish a synagogue and cemetery, operate market stalls and engage in trade. The community developed into one of the most important Jewish centres in the Polish–Lithuanian Commonwealth; in the 17th and 18th centuries it was regarded as second in importance only to the Jewish community of Kraków.

The present Great Synagogue was built in 1642 on the site of an earlier wooden synagogue. A Jewish cemetery had already been established in 1522 and is among the oldest surviving Jewish cemeteries in Poland. By the end of the 18th century Jews constituted more than half of the town's population. Before World War II, around 2,000 Jews lived in Tykocin, accounting for roughly 44% of its inhabitants.

=== Late modern era ===
Following the Partitions of Poland Tykocin was annexed by Prussia and Izabella Poniatowska-Branicka sold the town to the Prussian government in 1795. In 1807, it was briefly regained by Poles as part of the Duchy of Warsaw in accordance with the Treaty of Tilsit. In 1815, it became part of the Congress Kingdom of Poland, later forcibly annexed by the Russian Empire. In the 19th century, the town lost its status as a major economic, cultural and religious centre in the region, particularly following the January Uprising.

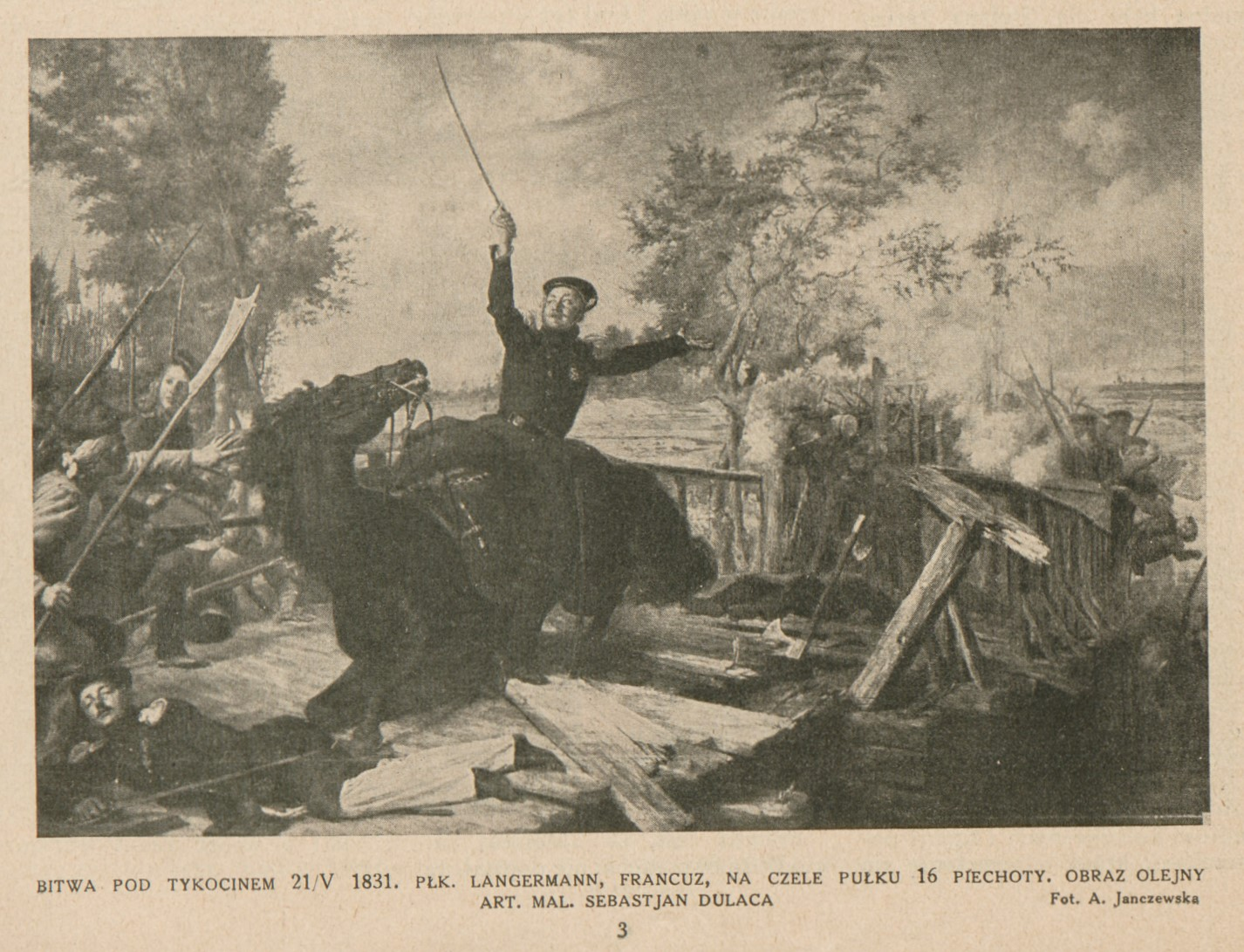
French colonel Georges Frédéric Langermann, commander of the Polish 16th Infantry Regiment, in the Battle of Tykocin in 1831

During the November Uprising, on 21 May 1831, Polish insurgents won a battle against the Russians at Tykocin. After the massacres of Polish protesters committed by the Russians in Warsaw in 1861, Polish demonstrations and clashes with Russian soldiers took place in Tykocin. Shortly after the outbreak of the January Uprising, Tykocin was the site of a battle between Polish insurgents and Russian troops on 24–25 January 1863. During the uprising, Tykocin was attacked by a Cossack unit led by Captain Dmitriyev, who forced the populace to sign a request to the tsarist administration to make him the town's military superior. In this way, he obtained office, and then committed murders of the inhabitants. Dmitriyev's cruelty even caused Russian officials to report him to the tsarist authorities, but he was only fined.

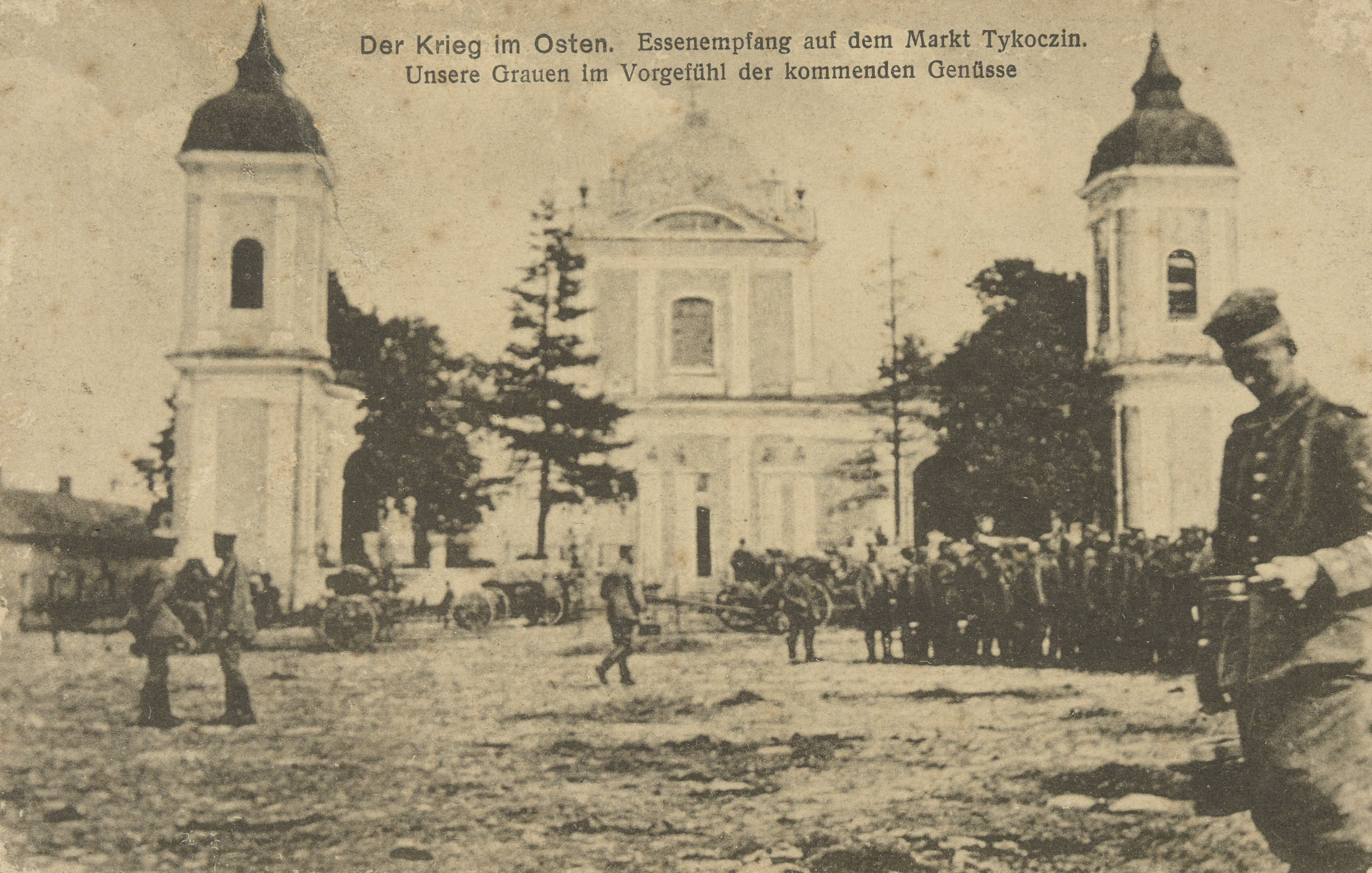
German occupying forces in Tykocin during World War I

During World War I, Tykocin was occupied by Germany from August 1915 to November 1918. Locals engaged in Polish national liberation activities as part of the Polish Military Organisation. On 11 November 1918, the day Poland regained its independence, the local commander of the Polish Military Organisation hoisted the Polish flag on the town hall. During the interwar period, the population of Tykocin had reached an estimated 4,000 inhabitants.

=== World War II ===
During the invasion of Poland, which started World War II in September 1939, Tykocin was first occupied by Germany. The Germans captured Polish and Jewish men and locked them in a church for three days without food or water, whilst looting Jewish property. After 28 September 1939, the town was occupied by the Soviet Union, which imposed Soviet citizenship on the inhabitants. The Polish intelligentsia, civil servants and activists were particularly subjected to Soviet repressions. Several dozen local Poles and Jews, as well as Jews fleeing from German-occupied territories, were deported deep into the Soviet Union.

From 1941 to 1944, it was occupied by Germany. The Jewish population of Tykocin, estimated at around 2,000 people, was almost entirely murdered during the Holocaust. On 25–26 August 1941, the Jewish residents of Tykocin were assembled at the market square for "relocation", and then marched and trucked by the Nazis into the nearby Łopuchowo forest, where they were executed in waves into pits by SS Einsatzkommando Zichenau-Schroettersburg under SS-Obersturmführer Hermann Schaper. The Germans then looted and ransacked Jewish property, destroying much of the Jewish material heritage.

On 27 May 1944, the Germans deported some 400 Polish inhabitants, men, women and teenagers, to concentration camps, in revenge for the assassination of the local German police chief by Polish partisans. During the round-up and deportation, there were attempts to escape; some were successful, whilst others were killed or recaptured.

=== Recent times ===
In 1950, Tykocin lost its town rights as a consequence of the severe population loss suffered during World War II; the rights were restored in 1993. From 1975 to 1998, it was administratively located in the former Białystok Voivodeship.

== Heritage and points of interest ==
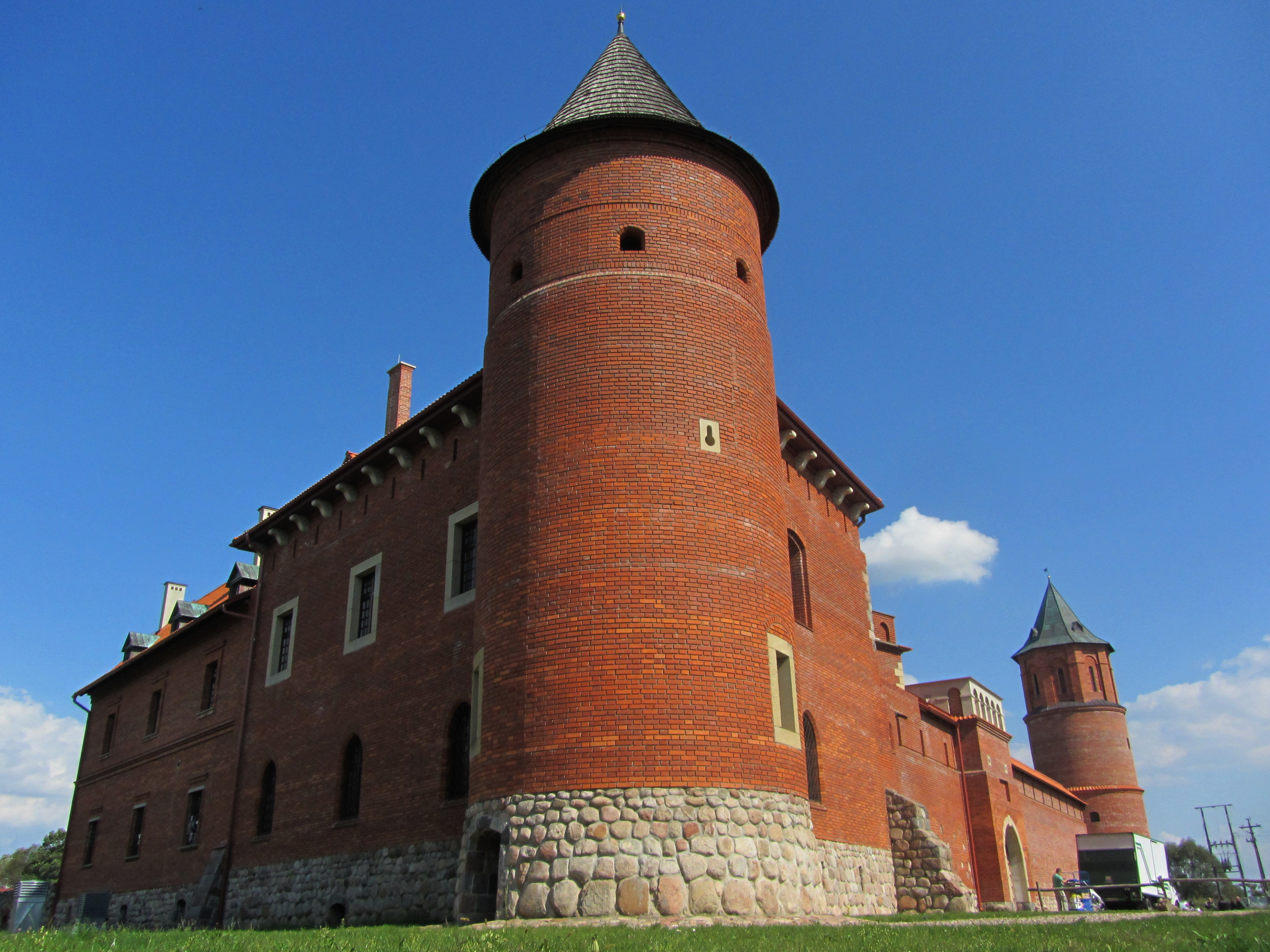
Tykocin Castle after reconstruction

Tykocin contains a preserved historic centre listed as a Historic Monument of Poland. More than 100 historic structures and sites survive in the town. The National Heritage Board of Poland's register includes the historic urban area and numerous religious, residential, military and engineering monuments.

Notable heritage sights include:

- the historic urban layout, dating from the 15th to 18th centuries, including the large market square (today Plac Czarnieckiego), reshaped as a Baroque composition after the destruction of 1656, and the smaller market area of the former Jewish quarter;
- Tykocin Castle, built before 1469, enlarged in the 16th century and partially reconstructed in the early 21st century;
- the Great Synagogue, built in 1642 and now a museum, and the late-18th-century Little Synagogue/Talmudic House;
- the Baroque Church of the Holy Trinity and former Missionaries' monastery complex, founded by Jan Klemens Branicki and built in 1741–1750;
- the former Bernardine monastery complex, built in 1771–1790;
- the military Alumnat, built in the 1630s as a home for veteran soldiers, one of the earliest institutions of its type in Poland;
- the 18th-century Rezydencja ekonomiczna (administrator's manor), erected for the Branicki estate;
- the Roman Catholic cemetery and its chapels, and the Jewish cemetery founded in 1522;
- surviving 18th- and 19th-century wooden and masonry houses around Plac Czarnieckiego and along Piłsudskiego, Złota, Kozia and 11 Listopada streets;
- a post office building dating from after 1815 and a wooden post mill from 1887;
- the historic steel road bridge over the Narew.

The monument to hetman Stefan Czarniecki, erected in the 18th century on the main square, is one of Poland's oldest secular monuments. The sandstone statue depicts Czarniecki in noble dress holding a gilded mace.

Other memorials include the Monument of the White Eagle, erected in 1982 and referring to the establishment of the Order of the White Eagle in Tykocin in 1705, a plaque commemorating Tykocin-born Mark Zamenhof, and a plaque unveiled in 2021 listing 400 Tykocin Jews murdered by the Germans in August 1941.

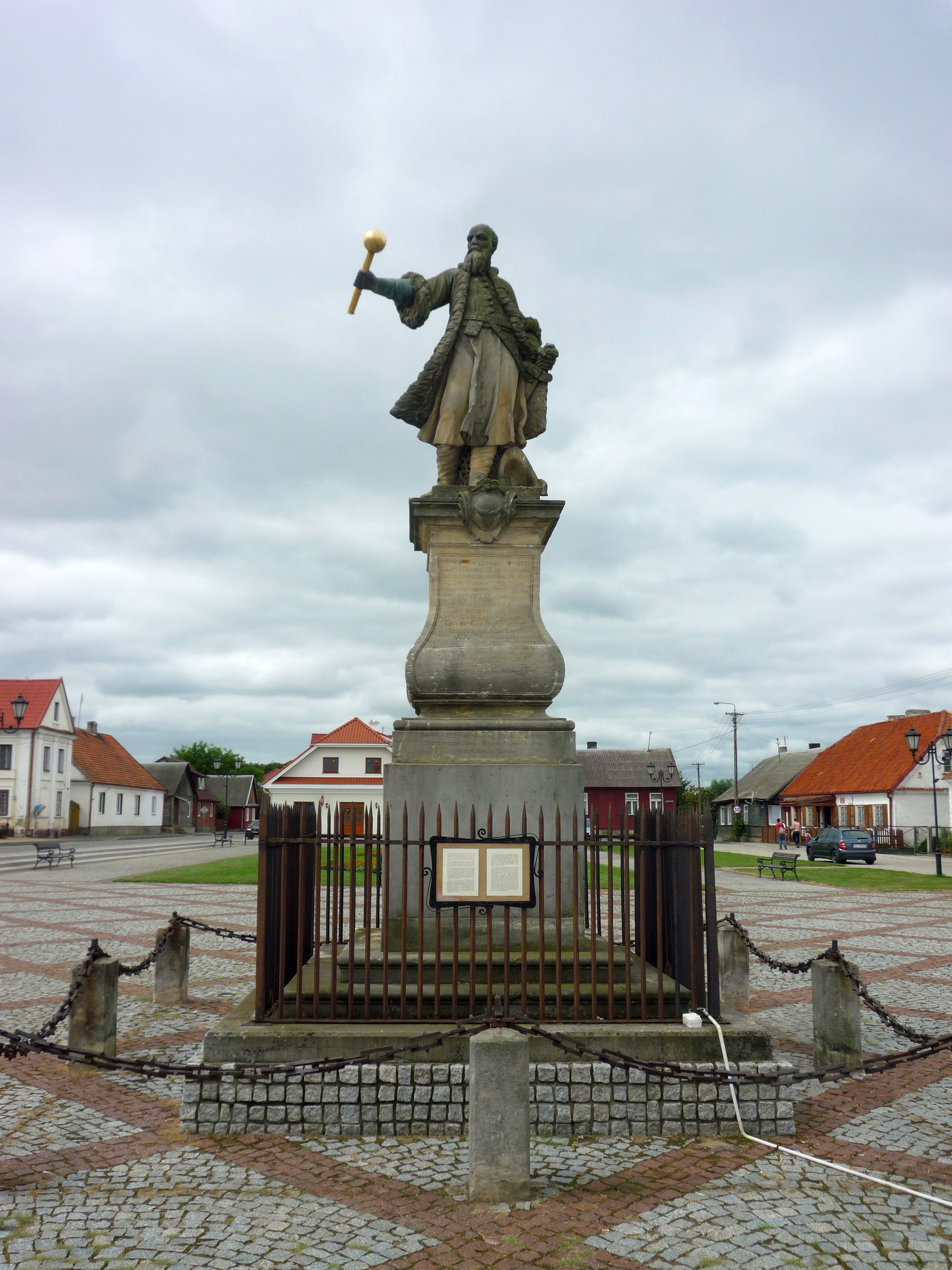
18th-century statue of hetman Stefan Czarniecki

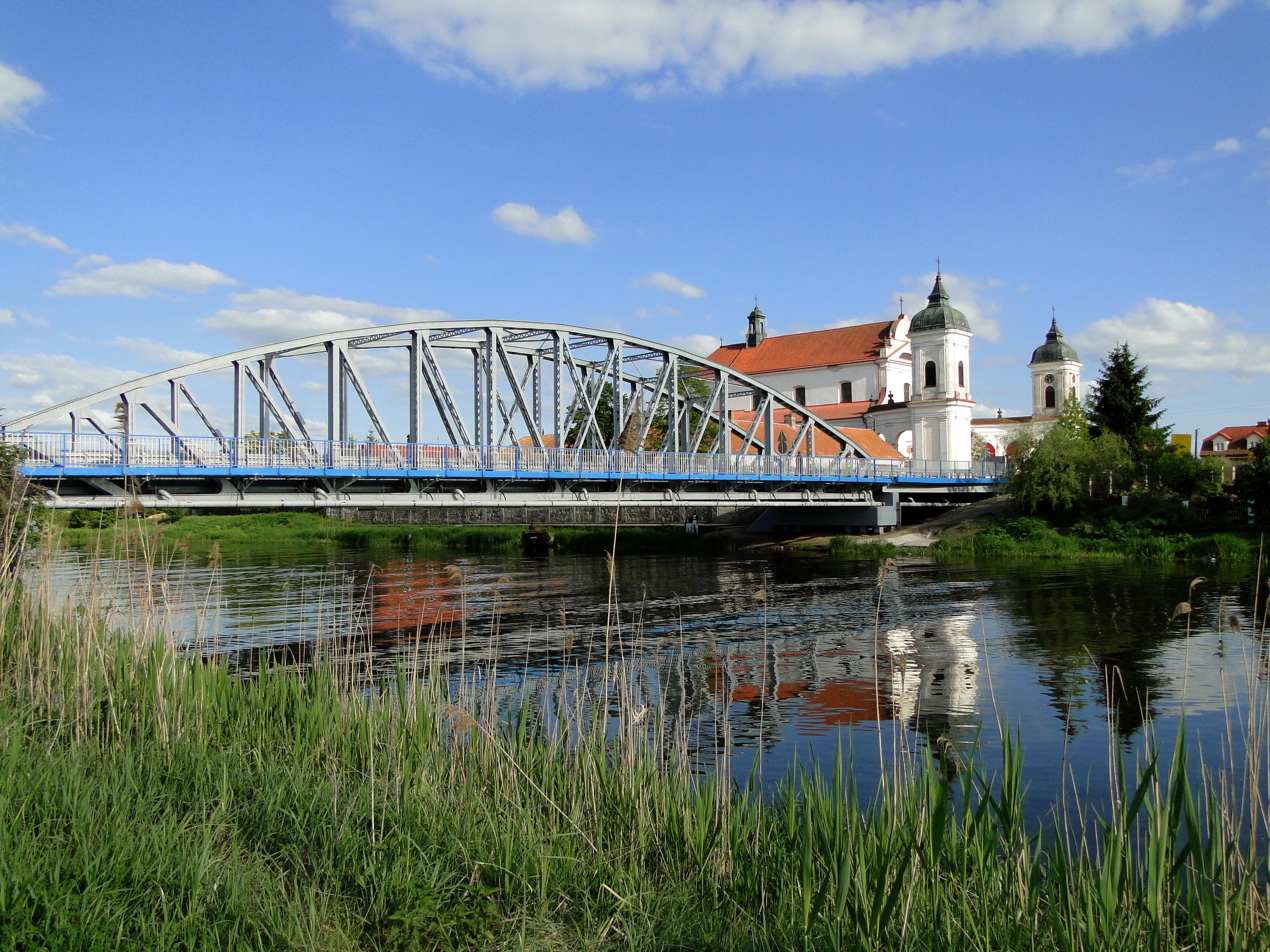
Church of the Holy Trinity and Narew River Bridge

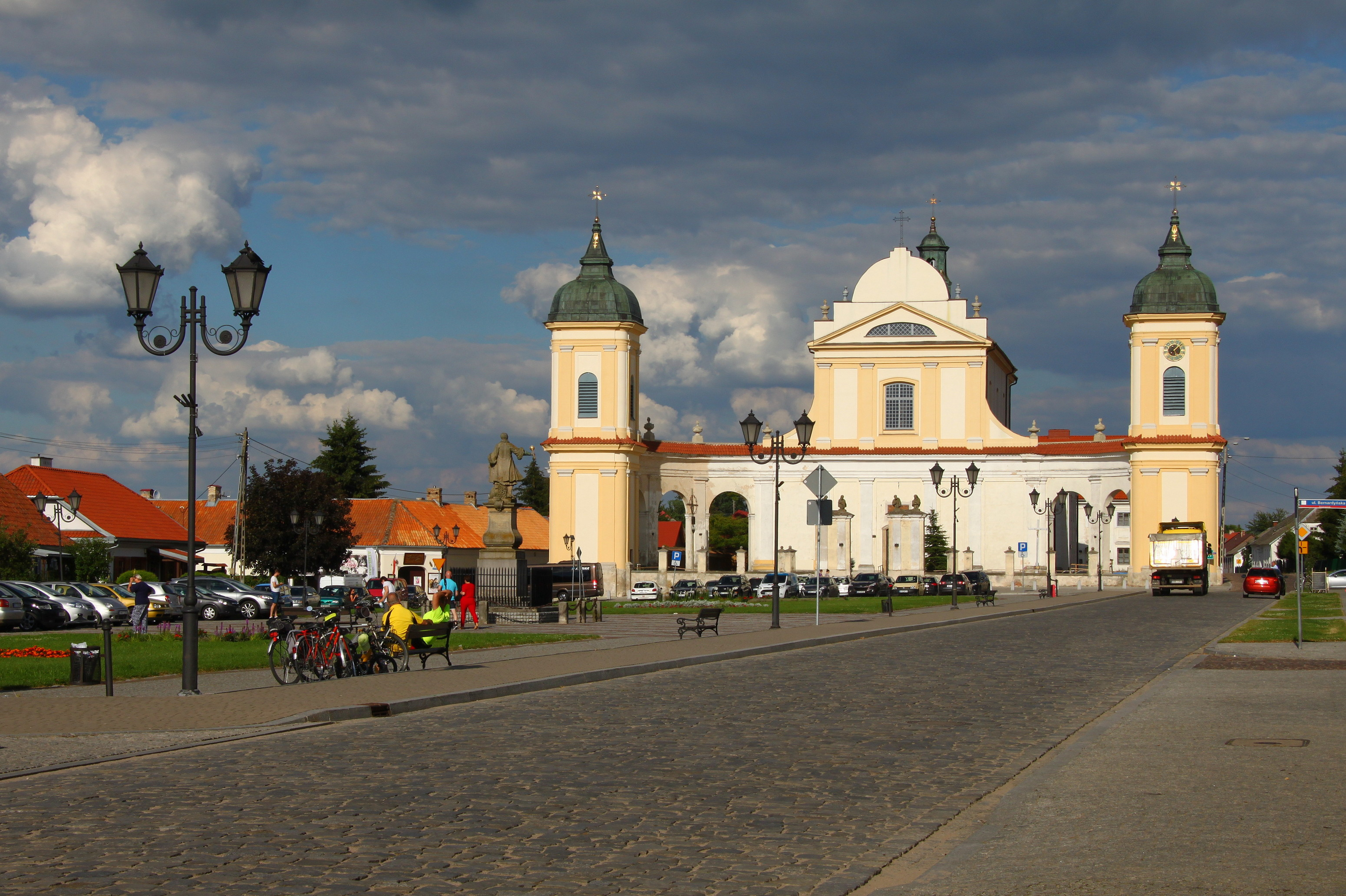
Church of the Holy Trinity

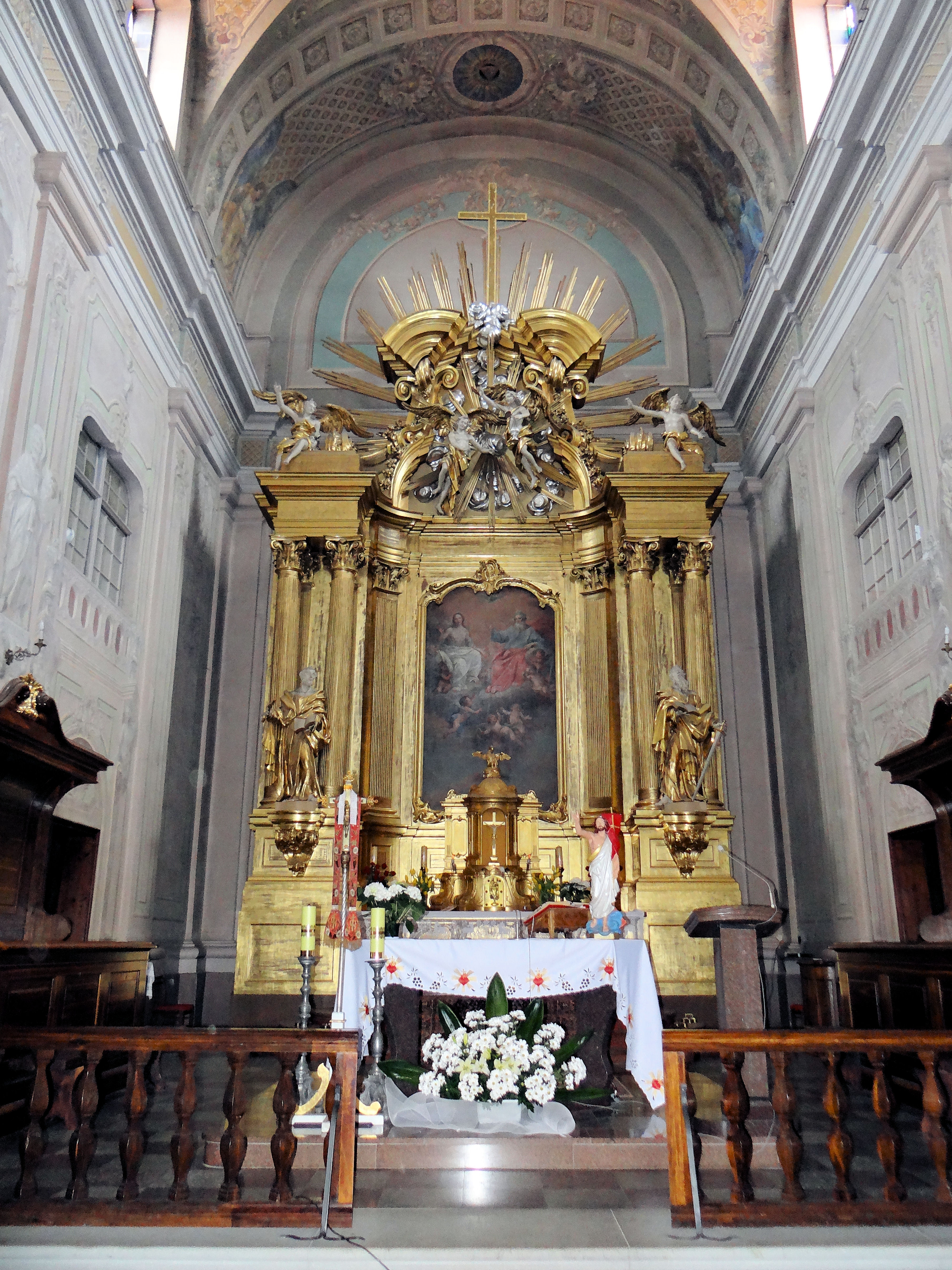
Main altar at Holy Trinity

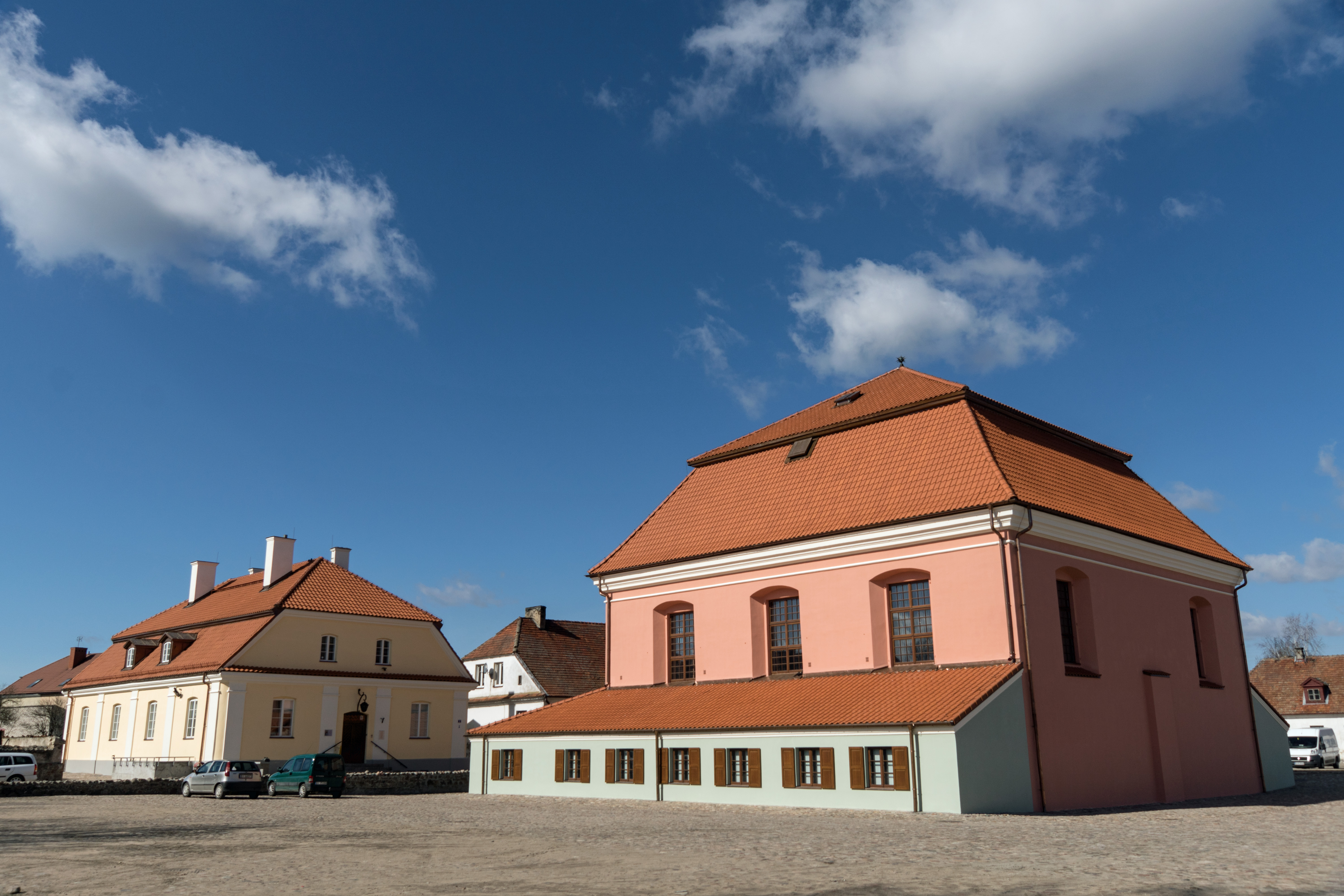
Great Synagogue and Little Synagogue

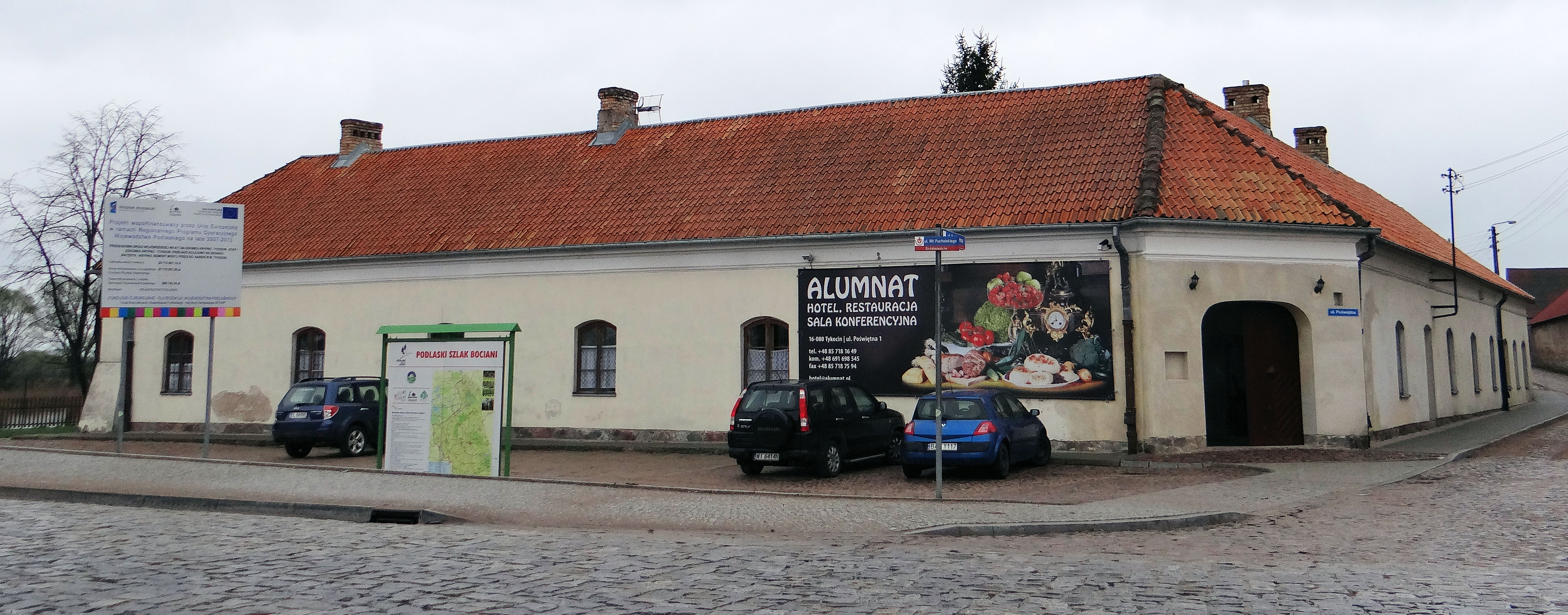
Former 17th-century military hospital, now a hotel and restaurant

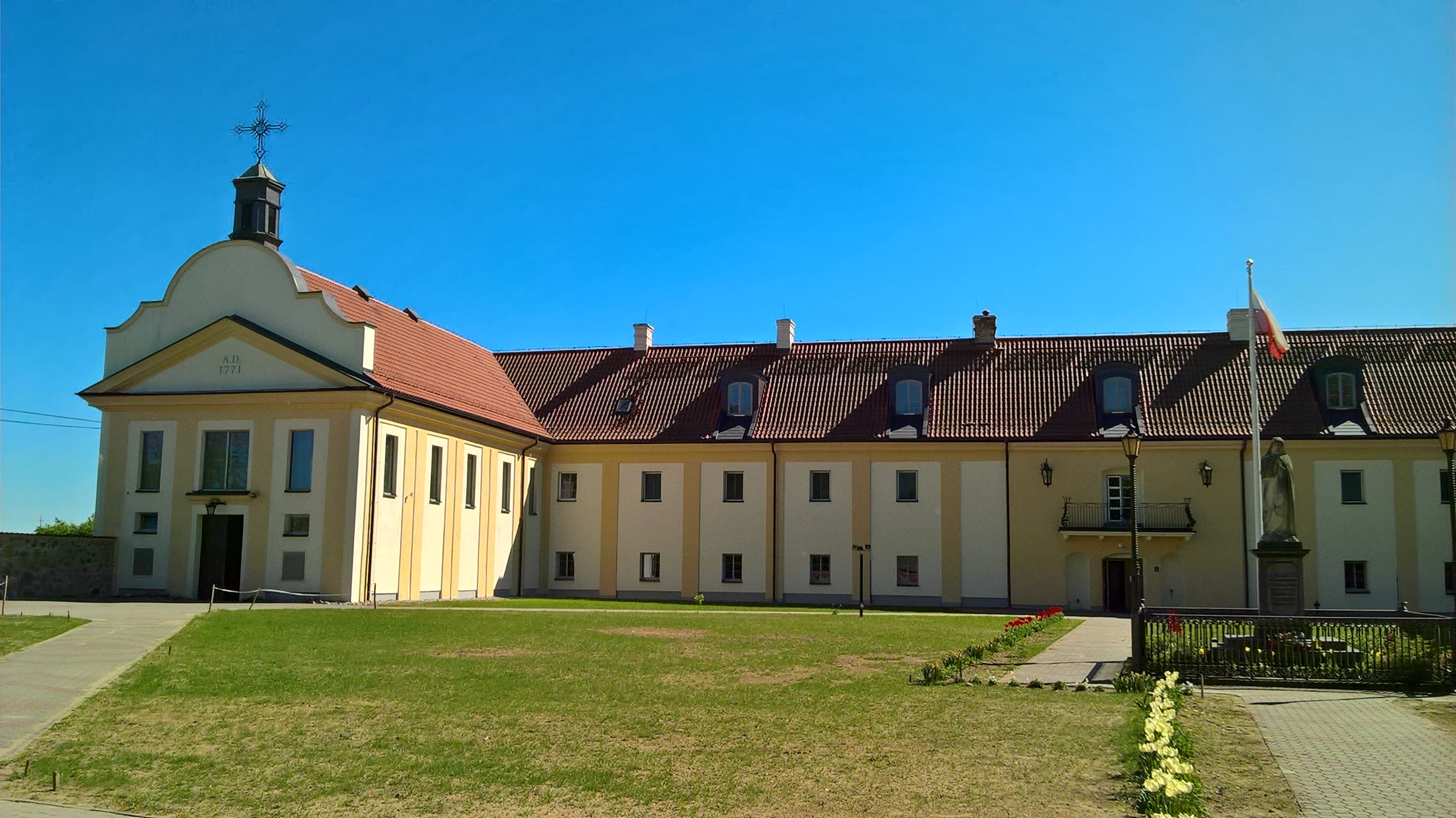
Bernardine Monastery

== Nature ==
Tykocin lies in the Narew valley, in an area noted for wetlands and a large population of white storks. The town lies on the Podlachian Stork Trail, which links areas around Białowieża National Park, Biebrza National Park and Narew National Park. In 2001, EuroNatur awarded Tykocin the title of a European Stork Village. Nearby Pentowo is known for a large colony of white storks and has birdwatching facilities.

Natural areas around the town include the Narew floodplain, the Tykocin marshes and the Szelągówka forest reserve. Narew National Park and Biebrza National Park are within the wider region.

== Transport ==
=== Roads ===
Voivodeship road 671 runs through Tykocin and intersects with the S8 expressway near Stare Jeżewo, south of the town.

=== Public transport ===
Tykocin is served by regional bus services. The nearest railway station is in Knyszyn, approximately 17 km (11 mi) from Tykocin.

== Culture ==
Cultural, educational and tourism activities are organised by Port Kultury Tykocin, based in a historic building at 2 Złota Street. The institution operates a tourist information point, organises cultural events and supports local artistic activity. The Museum in Tykocin, housed partly in the Great Synagogue complex, is a branch of the Podlaskie Museum in Białystok.

Recurring cultural events include historical fairs and reenactments, Jewish cultural events, organ concerts and the annual Tykocin Honey Feast (Tykocińska Biesiada Miodowa). One of the best-known historical events is the reenactment known as the Capture of Tykocin (Zdobycie Tykocina), commemorating fighting for the castle in the 17th century.

== Tourist trails ==
Several marked hiking and cycling routes pass through or begin in Tykocin. Among the hiking routes are the Łukasz Górnicki Trail, the Zygmunt Gloger Trail, the Queen Bona Trail and the Podlachian Stork Trail. The Queen Bona Trail links Tykocin with Knyszyn, Czarna Białostocka and Kopna Góra and is approximately 76 km (47 mi) long.

The 90 km (56 mi) Narew cycling loop (Obwodnica Narwiańska) runs around Narew National Park and its buffer zone, passing through Choroszcz, Turośń Dolna, Suraż, Łapy, Waniewo, Kurowo, Stare Jeżewo and Tykocin.

Tykocin lies directly alongside the Green Velo Eastern Cycle Trail, one of the longest continuously signposted long-distance cycling route in Poland. The Green Velo route in the region provides cycling connections towards the Narew valley and other destinations in Podlaskie Voivodeship. Tykocin is also situated near cycling routes associated with the Narew National Park; the approximately 87-kilometre cycling circuit around the park runs between Tykocin and Suraż and is connected with Green Velo.

== Notable individuals ==
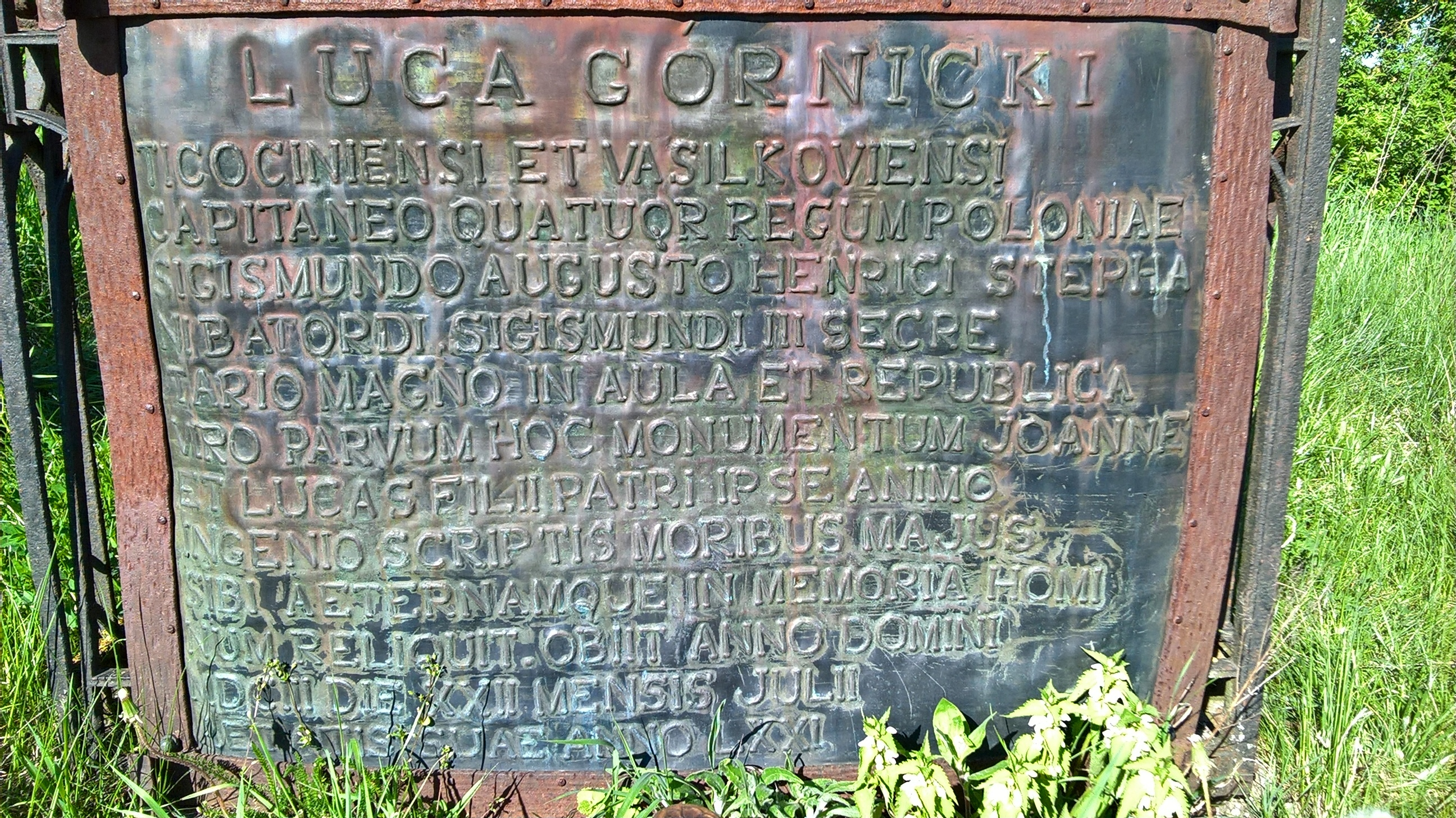
17th-century memorial to Renaissance poet Łukasz Górnicki erected by his sons

- Joshua Höschel ben Joseph (c. 1578–1648), Polish rabbi
- Jan Klemens Branicki (1689–1771), Field Crown Hetman of the Polish–Lithuanian Commonwealth
- Bolesław Gebert (1895–1986), Communist Party official
- Łukasz Górnicki (1527–1603), Renaissance writer and royal official
- Michał Jankowski (1842–1912), Polish insurgent against Russian rule, sybirak and naturalist
- Mikołaj Ostroróg (1593–1651), Polish-Lithuanian nobleman
- Bogusław Radziwiłł (1620–1669), Polish-Lithuanian prince and magnate
- Janusz Radziwiłł (1612–1655), Polish-Lithuanian prince, magnate and Field Hetman of Lithuania
- Paweł Jan Sapieha (1609–1665), Hetman and military commander
- Jan Smółko (b. 1907, AK alias Lokalizator) and his wife Władysława (b. 1908), Polish Righteous among the Nations, who produced more than one hundred false identity documents for Tykocin Jews during World War II using Catholic parish records
- Rebecca bat Meir Tiktiner (d. 1550), Jewish writer and scholar
- Krzysztof Wiesiołowski (d. 1637), nobleman and starost of Tykocin
- Mark Zamenhof (1837–1907), teacher and father of L. L. Zamenhof
