= Kiślaki, Białystok County =

Kiślaki
- Village
- Location within Poland
- Coordinates: 53°14′N 22°43′E
- Country: Poland
- Voivodeship: Podlaskie
- County: Białystok
- Gmina: Tykocin

Kiślaki [kiˈɕlaki] is a village in the administrative district of Gmina Tykocin, within Białystok County, Podlaskie Voivodeship, in north-eastern Poland.
