= Downary-Plac =

- Village
- Location within Poland
- Coordinates: 53°26′58″N 22°42′05″E
- Country: Poland
- Voivodeship: Podlaskie
- County: Mońki
- Gmina: Goniądz

Downary-Plac [dɔvˈnarɨ] is a village in the administrative district of Gmina Goniądz, within Mońki County, Podlaskie Voivodeship, in north-eastern Poland.

Downary-Plac are located on the edge of the Biebrza Valley and coatings for the Biebrza National Park. By the village runs a country road and county road connecting the Trzcianne Goniądz. It was formed in rural areas Downary in the 19th century as a settlement - the tsarist army barracks located near the Osowiec Fortress.
