= Red Marsh Nature Reserve =

Nature reserve in Poland

- Rezerwat przyrody Czerwone Bagno
- The moose (Eurasian elk) – king of the Red Marsh
- Interactive map of Red Marsh Nature Reserve
- Location: Podlaskie Voivodeship, Poland
- Nearest city: Osowiec-Twierdza
- Coordinates: 53°31′09″N 22°42′33″E
- Area: 116.29 km^{2} (44.90 sq mi)
- Established: 1981
- Governing body: Polish Ministry of the Environment

Red Marsh Nature Reserve (Polish: Rezerwat przyrody Czerwone Bagno) is a nature reserve with an area of 11,629.75 hectares located within the municipalities; Goniądz and Rajgród in Podlaskie Voivodeship northeastern Poland. The reserve is located within Biebrza National Park.

== History ==
This nature reserve encompasses one of the few places in the middle of Europe to have retained vast, sparsely populated and relatively undisturbed area of marsh (swamp), wilderness located in the Middle Basin of Biebrza. Part of the area is formed by interwar period designated nature reserves: the Red Marsh (consisting of mosaic of bog woodland, bog, swamp, mire and marsh habitats) and Perches (consisting of mineral islands formed by former shafts dune occupied by calcareous sand grasslands and oak and hornbeam woodlands surrounded by fenland). Current site was extended in 1981. A promoter of these sites and an activist for the preservation of remaining natural ecosystems in Poland, professor Simona Kossak, is the author of a daily broadcast (What's hot) on "Radio Bialystok". Presence of this nature reserves and surrounding areas of wilderness was the main reason for the designation of Biebrza National Park in 1989.

== Fauna ==
The Red Marsh, being away from the overflow land, wetlands, and riparian morass of the river, Biebrza is different in nature because it creates bogs overgrown with dwarf trees, which provide an excellent refuge for animals, especially for the rare and protected ungulate – moose (Alces alces), and red deer (Cervus elaphus) and roe deer (Capreolus capreolus). Many packs of wolves also reside within the reserve. In addition, these sites are ideal bedding and nesting sites for birds: white-tailed eagle (Haliaeetus albicilla), golden eagle (Aquila chrysaetos) and the lesser spotted eagle (Aquila pomarina) which is under strict protection overall.

== Flora ==
A valuable asset of the Red Swamp is not only natural habitat conditions for animals, but also unique vegetation. Plant species under strict protection include:

- Birch (Betula humilis Schrank) – shrub reaching a height of 2 m
- Drosera rotundifolia (Drosera rotundifolia L.) – carnivorous plant
- Pedicularis sceptrum-carolinum)
