= Doły, Mońki County =

Doły
- Village
- Location within Poland
- Coordinates: 53°26′16″N 22°41′18″E
- Country: Poland
- Voivodeship: Podlaskie
- County: Mońki
- Gmina: Goniądz

Doły [ˈdɔwɨ] is a village in the administrative district of Gmina Goniądz, within Mońki County, Podlaskie Voivodeship, in north-eastern Poland.

The village lies in the rural area of Gmina Goniądz, approximately 4 kilometres from the town of Goniądz. The surrounding area is predominantly rural and consists of agricultural land and small settlements.

According to the 2021 Polish census, Doły had a population of 69 inhabitants. The village is one of the smaller settlements within Gmina Goniądz. The population has declined compared with earlier census figures.

Doły is administered by Gmina Goniądz, a mixed urban-rural municipality in Mońki County. The municipality is centred on the town of Goniądz, which lies near the Biebrza River and the Biebrza National Park.

The village is connected with neighbouring settlements by local roads. A road connecting Kosiorki and Doły forms part of the local road network of Gmina Goniądz.

== Administration ==
Doły is part of Gmina Goniądz in Mońki County, Podlaskie Voivodeship. The village has the status of a sołectwo (village administrative unit) within the municipality.

== Demographics ==
Doły had 69 inhabitants according to the 2021 National Population and Housing Census. Of these, 37 were women and 32 were men.

== Geography ==
Doły is situated in north-eastern Poland, in the Podlaskie Voivodeship. The village is located near Goniądz and is part of the rural landscape surrounding the Biebrza valley.

== Transport ==
The village is served by local roads connecting it with neighbouring settlements and Goniądz. In 2024, works were undertaken to modernise the district road between Kosiorki and Doły.

== See also ==
Goniądz

Mońki County

Podlaskie Voivodeship

Biebrza National Park
