= Symon Budny =

Polish-Belarusian writer and philosopher

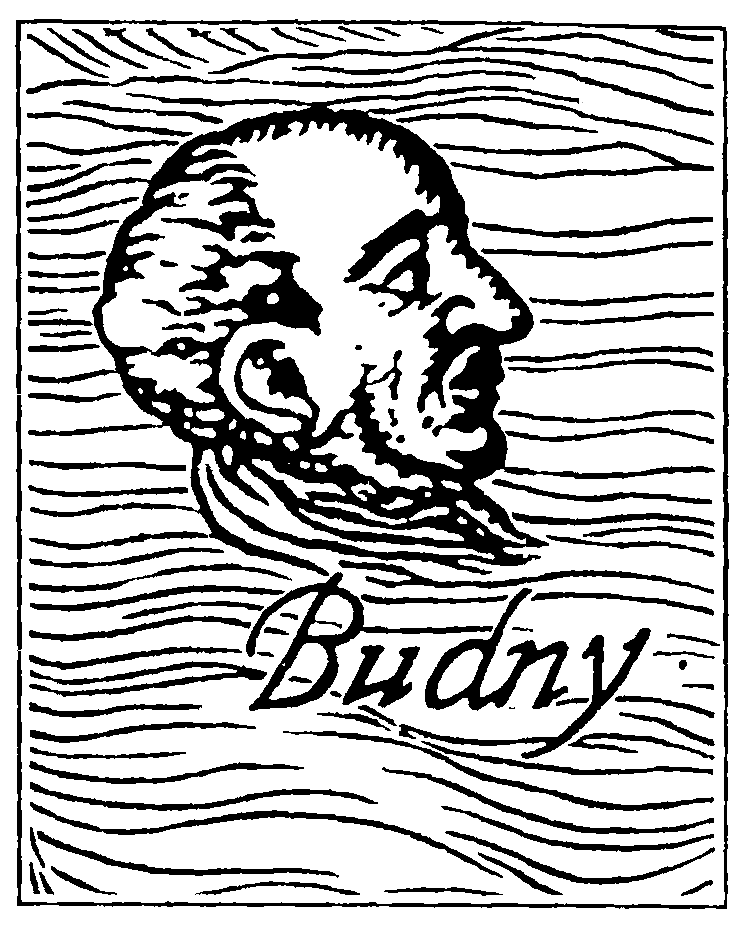

Szymon Budny or Symon Budny (Belarusian: Сымон Будны, Polish: Szymon Budny, Russian: Симон Будный; c.1533, Budne – 13 January 1593, Vishnyeva) was a Polish-Belarusian humanist, educator, Hebraist, Bible translator, Protestant reformer, philosopher, sociologist and historian, active in the territory of the Polish–Lithuanian Commonwealth. He was one of the first to promote the development of Belarusian culture in the Belarusian language. He was one of the leaders of the Polish Brethren.

== Place of birth ==
Little is known about his place of birth. Though the common assumption is that he was born in Budne, Podlaskie Voivodeship, it is known that there were over 140 places with a similar name on the territory of Belarus. Though what is known is that he was familiar with the Belarusian culture first-hand and dedicated a big part of his life to promoting it. The family he was born into was a minor Belarusian szlachta. Symon Budny originally identified himself as a Litvin, which then was the term used mostly to describe Belarusians.

== Christology ==
Symon Budny was an early figure in the party in the Radical Reformation which utterly denied the divinity of Jesus Christ. Budny, along with the Greek Unitarian Jacobus Palaeologus, and the Hungarian Ferenc David, denied not just the pre-existence of Christ, which is what distinguished "Socinian" from "Arian" belief, but Budny, Paleologus and David went further and also denied invocation of Christ. Among these three Budny also denied the virgin birth. According to Wilbur (1947) it was his strong stance against the worship of and prayer to Christ that brought a separation with those like Marcin Czechowic who considered the views of Budny, Paleologus, and David as a revival of the Ebionite position and a form of Judaizing, and resulted in Budny's excommunication from the Minor Reformed Church of Poland, though subsequent Eastern European historians consider that in Budny's case it may have been on account of his note in the Belarusian New Testament stating that Jesus was Joseph's son, as much as the better known in the West letter to Fausto Sozzini (1581) to which Sozzini's answer is preserved in Volume II of the Bibliotheca Fratrum Polonorum printed by Sozzini's grandson in Amsterdam, 1668.

== Budny and rabbinical commentary ==
For all that Budny was accused of "Judaizing" by Czechowic and Sozzini, and excommunicated from the Polish-Lithuanian-Belarusian Unitarian community, Budny was still regarded as a Christian adversary in the polemical work Chizzuk Emunah (“Strengthened Faith”) of Isaac Troky, who made counter-use of Budny's historical-critical biblical exegesis.

== Political views ==
Budny supported the limited educated monarchy concept of the state (with Andrzej Frycz Modrzewski), which would enable the development of the Sejm.

Gregory Paul of Brzeziny (Gregorius Paulus) and Palaeologus had been involved in a long heated exchange over the role of the Christian in the state since 1572, which had been kept unpublished. Though Marcin Czechowic in Dialogue XII of his Christian Colloquies, took Grzegorz Paweł z Brzezin's non-violent position. In 1580 Budny, then the leading minister among the socially conservative Lithuanian Brethren, published the whole correspondence, including Palaeologus' taunts of the pacifist position of the Ecclesia Minor Polish Brethren in his Defensio. The Polish brethren then asked Grzegorz Paweł z Brzezin to write a reply but he excused himself on the grounds of ill health, and the task fell to the then 41-year-old Fausto Sozzini, which he did and published a defence of conscientious objection and separation from the state in 1581.

== Belarusian language ==
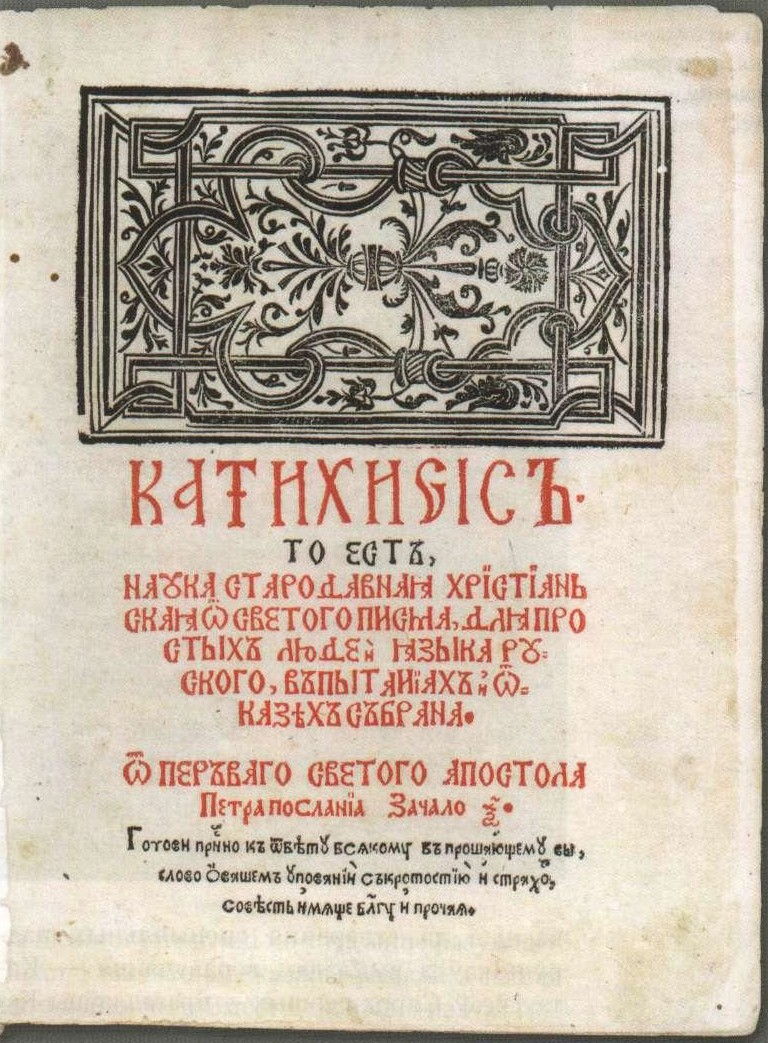
Belarusian Catechism printed in Niasvizh, 1562

Budny was one of the first ideologists of the development the Belarusian culture in its native language, and had notable influence on the development of Belarusian national consciousness. In his Cathechesis (printed in 1562, Niasvizh, in Belarusian) Budny follows Francysk Skaryna in using native Belarusian speech to explain Christianity.

"So that his Ducal Highness should not only enjoy foreign languages, but also would fall in love with the ancient Slavic language and enjoy it too... And so that all others would follow this good example and the Fatherland and its native language would have future and hope".

=== Polish language ===
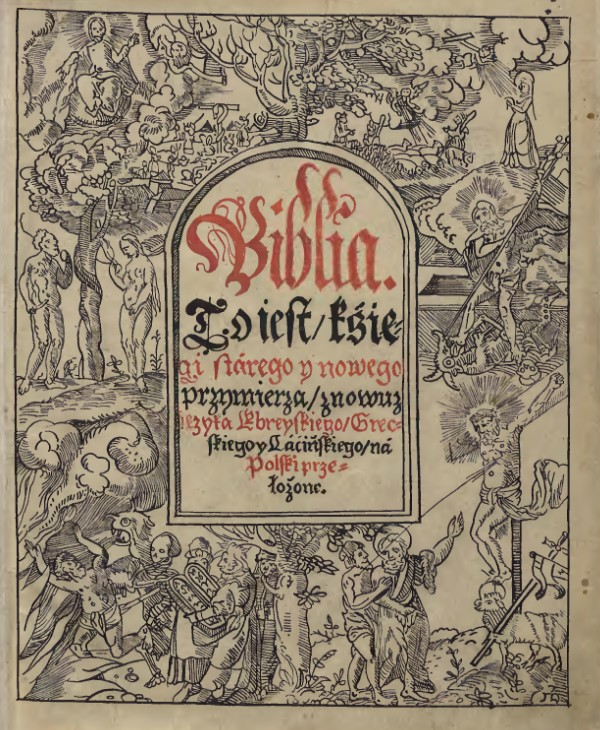
Polish "Niasvizh Bible" translated by Budny, 1572

However subsequently Budny surrendered and started to write in Polish. He tried to justify it by saying:

Głupstwo to jest mową jednej krainy gardzić, a drugiej słówka pod niebiosa wynosić.
"It is folly to scorn the language of one country, and praise the tongue of another up to the heavens".

He translated the Bible into Polish, known in Poland today as the Biblia Nieświeska (Nesvizh Bible), since it was translated 1568-1572 at Nesvizh (Polish: Nieśwież). As changes were introduced in the printing a second edition of New Testament appeared in 1574. His former colleague Marcin Czechowic produced his own Polish New Testament in Lublin in 1577.

== Works ==
- He published the Old Testament and New Testament (Biblia Nieświeska) with commentaries and notes in Polish (Zasłaŭje, Belarus 1572), which contained an early radical rationalist critique of the Gospels, and showed some knowledge of the Talmud.
- Catechism The work is written in the then common form of questions and answers, and consists of four sections: on 10 Amendments, on the symbol of belief, about praying to God and on the rituals.
- O opravdanii greshnogo cheloveka pred Bogom ("On the justification of sinful men in front of God"). Budny is developing Protestant ideas, but also some of his Socinian (Arian) preferences. He criticizes the conscientious objector wing of the Polish brethren such as Marcin Czechowic who considered that a Christian cannot take part in earthly power, has no rights of ownership of land and people in his property, and can not participate in war and use sword.

Note: proper names and places’ names are rendered in BGN/PCGN.

== See also ==
- Johann Gutenberg
- Ivan Fedorov
- Spiridon Sobol
- Spread of the printing press
- Piotr Blastus Kmita

== Literature ==
- Stefan Fleischmann: Szymon Budny. Ein theologisches Portrait des polnisch-weißrussischen Humanisten und Unitariers (ca. 1530–1593). Böhlau, Köln 2006, ISBN 3-412-04306-0
- В. Плиссъ: Симонъ Будный и его сектантская и литературная дѣятельность въ Литвѣ и Западной Руси // Христiанское чтенiе. — 1914. — № 9. — С. 1046—1168; 1914. — № 10. — С. 1286—1316.
