= Białosuknia =

- Village
- Location within Poland
- Coordinates: 53°29′N 22°51′E
- Country: Poland
- Voivodeship: Podlaskie
- County: Mońki
- Gmina: Goniądz

Białosuknia [bjawɔˈsukɲa] is a village in the administrative district of Gmina Goniądz, within Mońki County, Podlaskie Voivodeship, in north-eastern Poland.
