= Wojtówstwo =

- Village
- Location within Poland
- Coordinates: 53°26′02″N 22°37′07″E
- Country: Poland
- Voivodeship: Podlaskie
- County: Mońki
- Gmina: Goniądz

Wojtówstwo [vɔi̯ˈtufstfɔ] is a village in the administrative district of Gmina Goniądz, within Mońki County, Podlaskie Voivodeship, in north-eastern Poland.
