= Budne-Żarnowo =

- Village
- Location within Poland
- Coordinates: 53°30′11″N 22°42′16″E
- Country: Poland
- Voivodeship: Podlaskie
- County: Mońki
- Gmina: Goniądz
- Population: 70

Budne-Żarnowo [ˈbudnɛ ʐarˈnɔvɔ] is a village in the administrative district of Gmina Goniądz, within Mońki County, Podlaskie Voivodeship, in north-eastern Poland.
