= Krzecze =

- Village
- Location within Poland
- Coordinates: 53°31′N 22°51′E
- Country: Poland
- Voivodeship: Podlaskie
- County: Mońki
- Gmina: Goniądz
- Population: 150

Krzecze [ˈkʂɛt͡ʂɛ] is a village in the administrative district of Gmina Goniądz, in Mońki County, Podlaskie Voivodeship, in northeastern Poland.
