= Wroceń =

- Village
- Location within Poland
- Coordinates: 53°31′42″N 22°50′53″E
- Country: Poland
- Voivodeship: Podlaskie
- County: Mońki
- Gmina: Goniądz

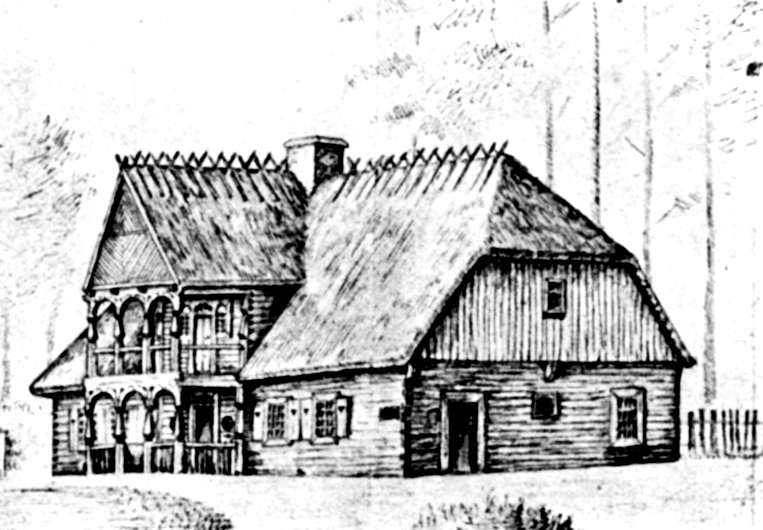
Manor in the Wroceń (illustration of the old Polish Encyclopedia Z. Gloger)

Wroceń [ˈvrɔt͡sɛɲ] is a village in the administrative district of Gmina Goniądz, within Mońki County, Podlaskie Voivodeship, in north-eastern Poland.
