= Owieczki, Podlaskie Voivodeship =

Owieczki
- Village
- Location within Poland
- Coordinates: 53°26′33″N 22°42′27″E
- Country: Poland
- Voivodeship: Podlaskie
- County: Mońki
- Gmina: Goniądz

Owieczki [ɔˈvjɛt͡ʂki] is a village in the administrative district of Gmina Goniądz, within Mońki County, Podlaskie Voivodeship, in north-eastern Poland.
