= Szafranki, Mońki County =

Szafranki
- Village
- Location within Poland
- Coordinates: 53°29′N 22°43′E
- Country: Poland
- Voivodeship: Podlaskie
- County: Mońki
- Gmina: Goniądz
- Time zone: UTC+1 (CET)
  - Summer (DST): UTC+2 (CEST)

Szafranki [ʂaˈfraŋki] is a village in the administrative district of Gmina Goniądz, within Mońki County, Podlaskie Voivodeship, in north-eastern Poland.

== History ==
Three Polish citizens were murdered by Nazi Germany in the village during World War II.
