= Smogorówka Dolistowska =

- Village
- Location within Poland
- Coordinates: 53°31′N 22°53′E
- Country: Poland
- Voivodeship: Podlaskie
- County: Mońki
- Gmina: Goniądz

Smogorówka Dolistowska [smɔɡɔˈrufka dɔlisˈtɔfska] is a village in the administrative district of Gmina Goniądz, within Mońki County, Podlaskie Voivodeship, in north-eastern Poland.
