= Kramkówka Duża =

- Village
- Location within Poland
- Coordinates: 53°25′51″N 22°40′59″E
- Country: Poland
- Voivodeship: Podlaskie
- County: Mońki
- Gmina: Goniądz

Kramkówka Duża [kramˈkufka ˈduʐa] is a village in the administrative district of Gmina Goniądz, within Mońki County, Podlaskie Voivodeship, in north-eastern Poland.
