= Dawidowizna =

- Village
- Location within Poland
- Coordinates: 53°26′18″N 22°41′16″E
- Country: Poland
- Voivodeship: Podlaskie
- County: Mońki
- Gmina: Goniądz

Dawidowizna [davidɔˈvizna] is a village in the administrative district of Gmina Goniądz, within Mońki County, Podlaskie Voivodeship, in north-eastern Poland.
