= Osowiec-Twierdza =

- Village
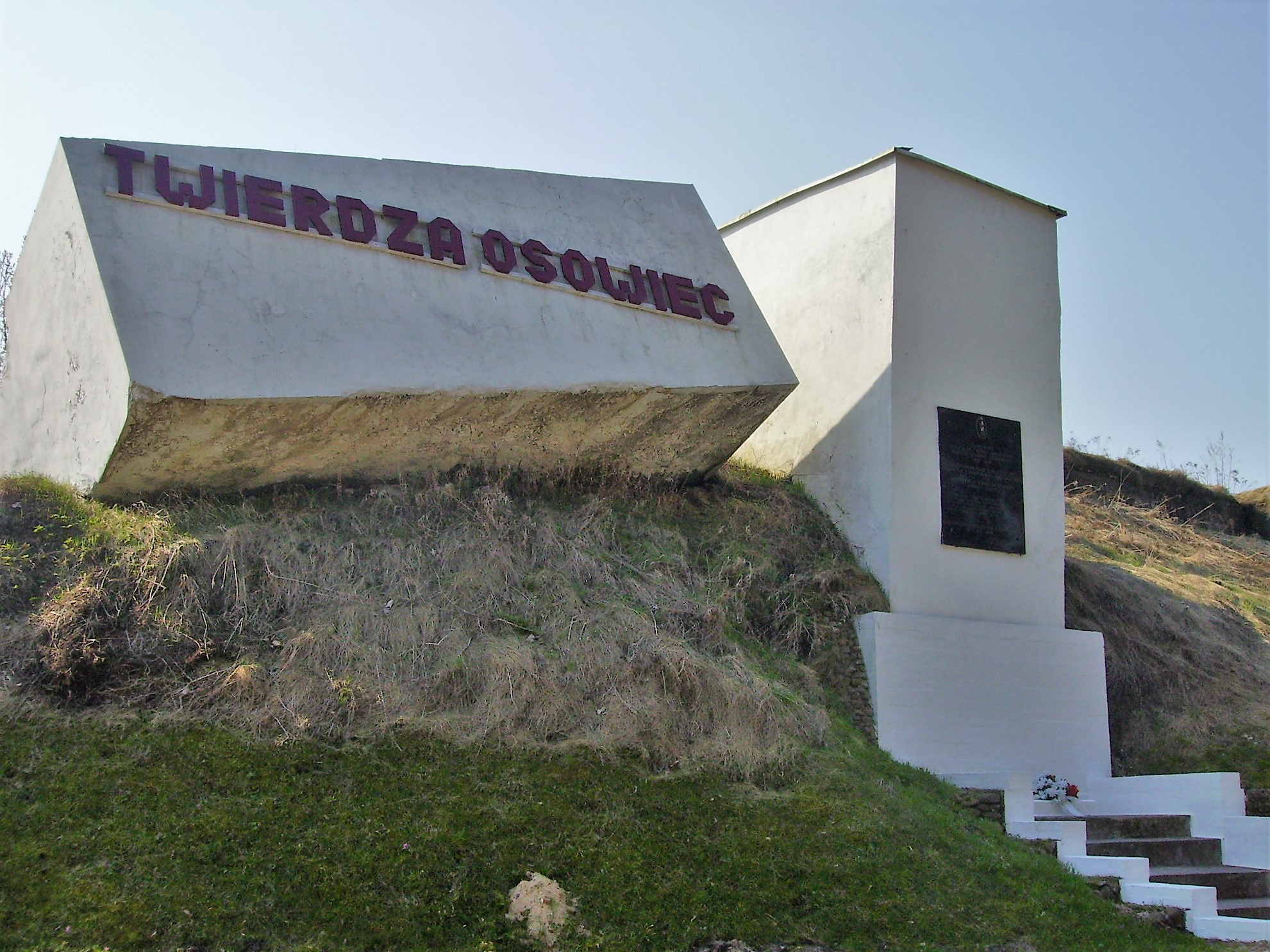
- Osowiec Fortress monument

- Location within Poland
- Coordinates: 53°28′25″N 22°39′26″E
- Country: Poland
- Voivodeship: Podlaskie
- County: Mońki
- Gmina: Goniądz

Population
  - Total: 630

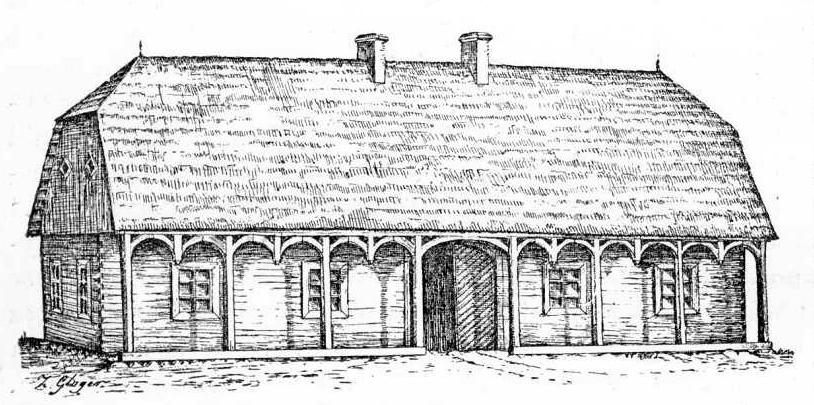
Osowiec. Pub of the eighteenth century, illustration Zygmunt Gloger, "Encyclopedia of Old Polish"

Osowiec-Twierdza [ɔˈsɔvjɛt͡s] is a village in the administrative district of Gmina Goniądz, in Mońki County, Podlaskie Voivodeship, in north-eastern Poland. Osowiec-Twierdza is home to Biebrza National Park.

== History ==
Excavations have revealed settlements in Osowiec from prehistoric times. Okrasa existed as a village since before AD 1444. From 1743 to 1827, Osowiec (as Marcinpol) was a city. In the nineteenth century, a railway line was built from Białystok to Ełk, Königsberg, and passing through Osowiec. From 1882 to 1892, the Russian army built a regional military defense strategy.

Further work built fortifications at the outbreak of World War I. From 1914 to 6 August 1915, the German 8th Army futilely struggled to break the defensive belt represented by Osowiec Fortress, which successfully defended the Russian troops. During the fighting, the German army used gas (chlorine), which killed about 2,000 of the Russian troops, after which they made a desperate last stand counter-attack which had become known as the Attack of the Dead Men. Finally, due to an unfavorable strategic situation at the front, the Russian troops left the fort at the end of August 1915.

Today some parts of the fortress are accessible to tourists, especially within the boundaries of Biebrza National Park. The visitor information center of the park is located in Osowiec-Twierdza, a small settlement located within the boundaries of the fortress.

== Gallery ==
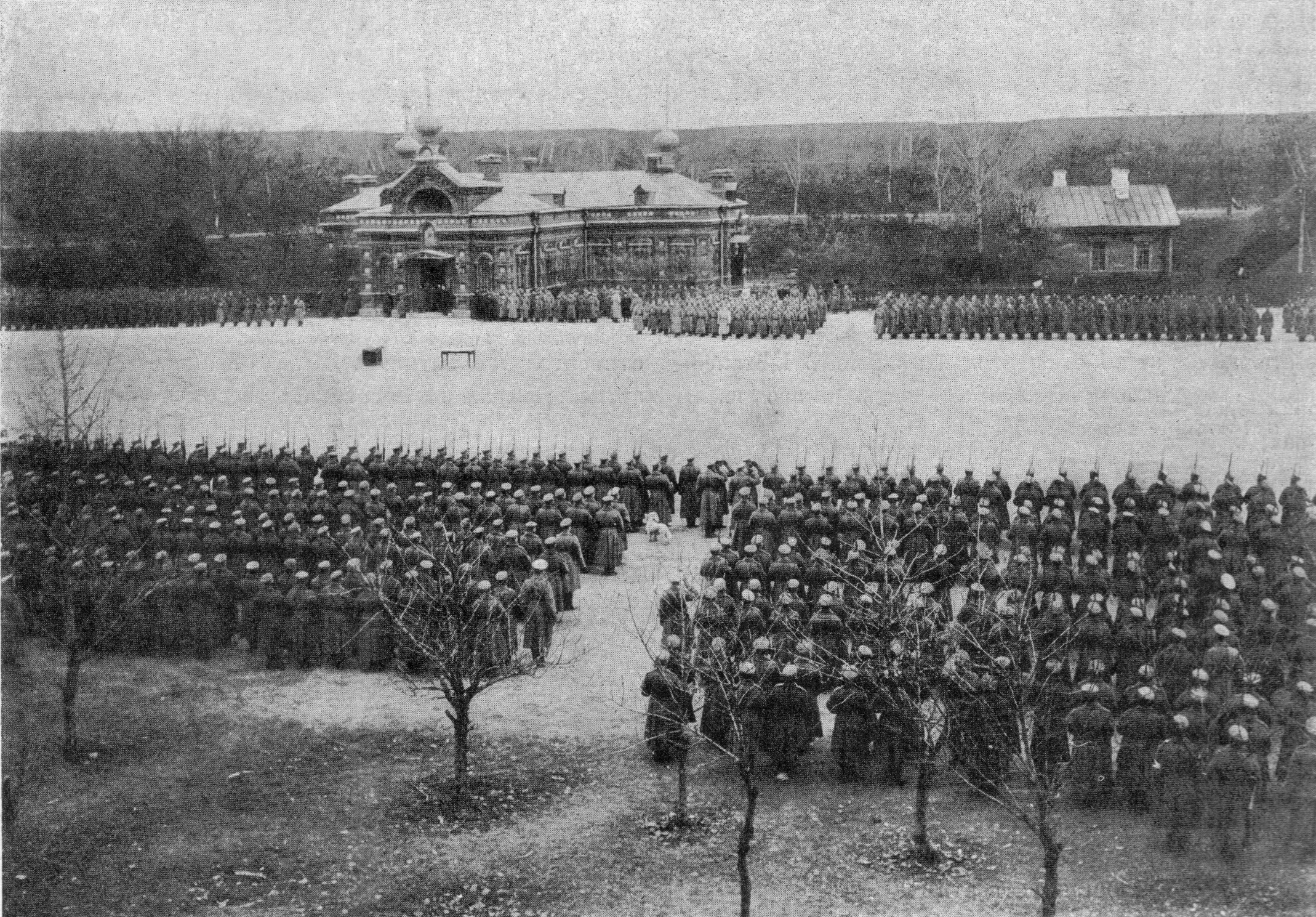
"1st fort" in Osowiec-Twierdza (1915). Church

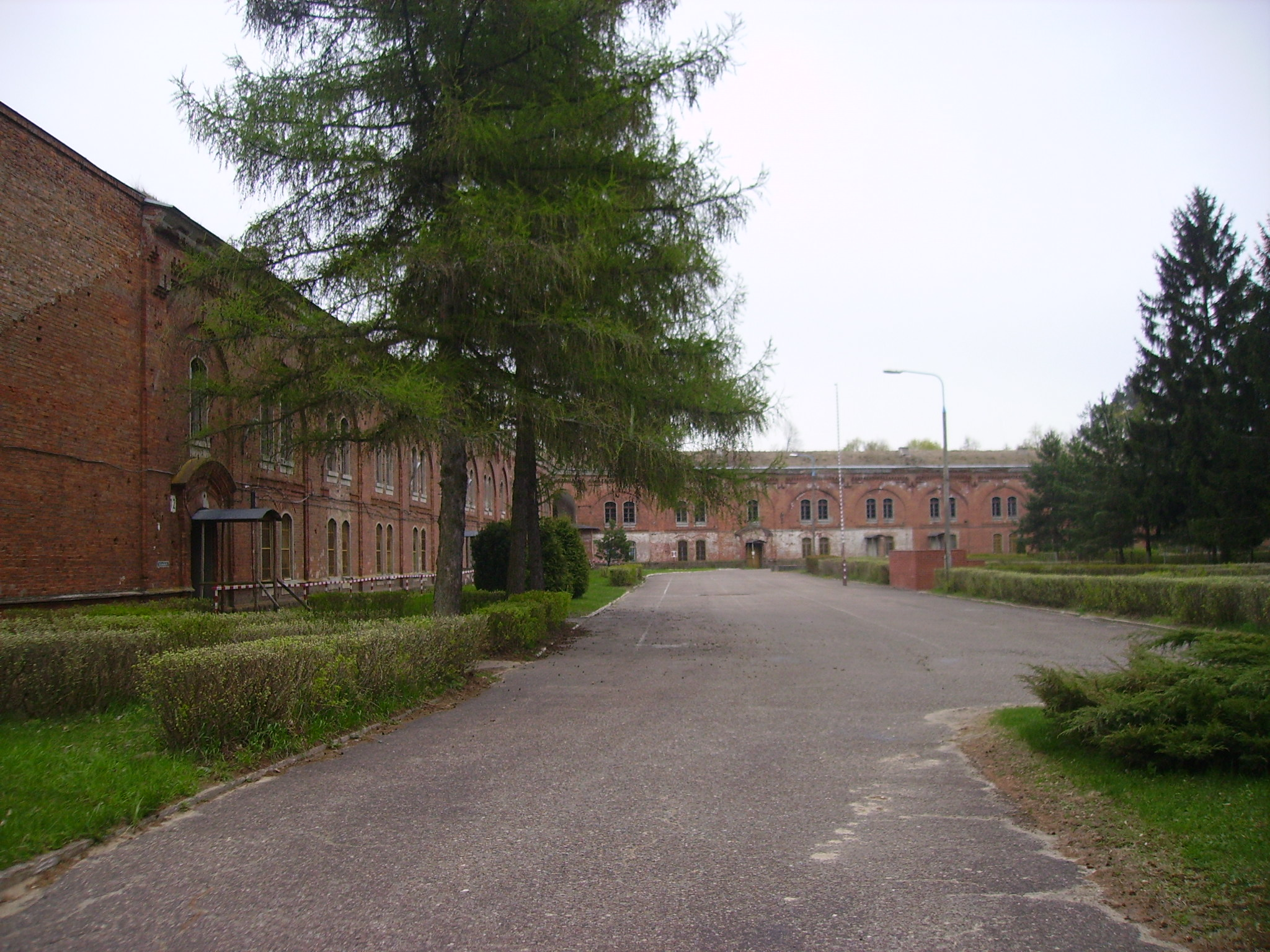
"1st fort" - barracks (2010)

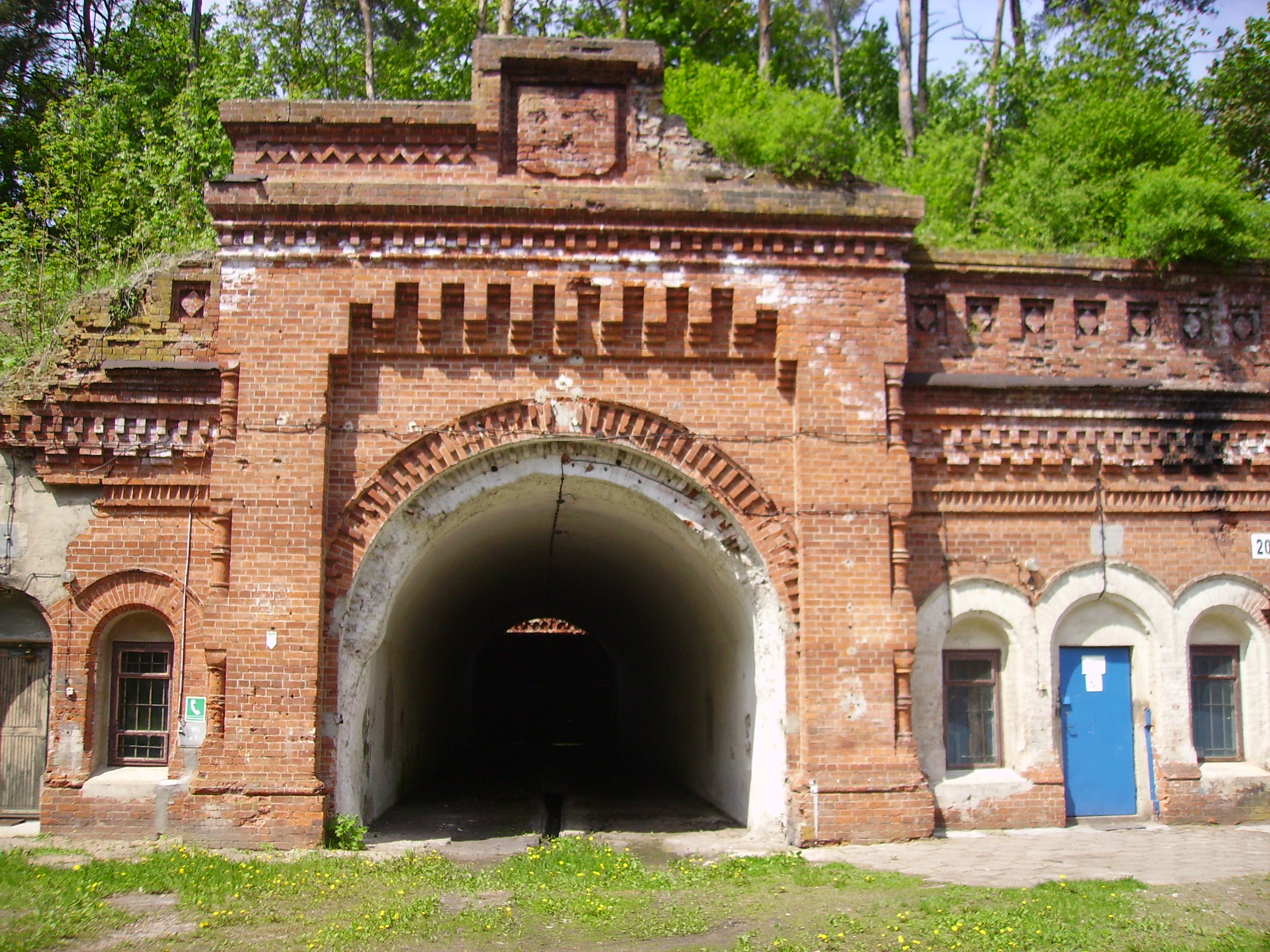
Fort I of Osowiec Fortress (Gate - west tunnel)

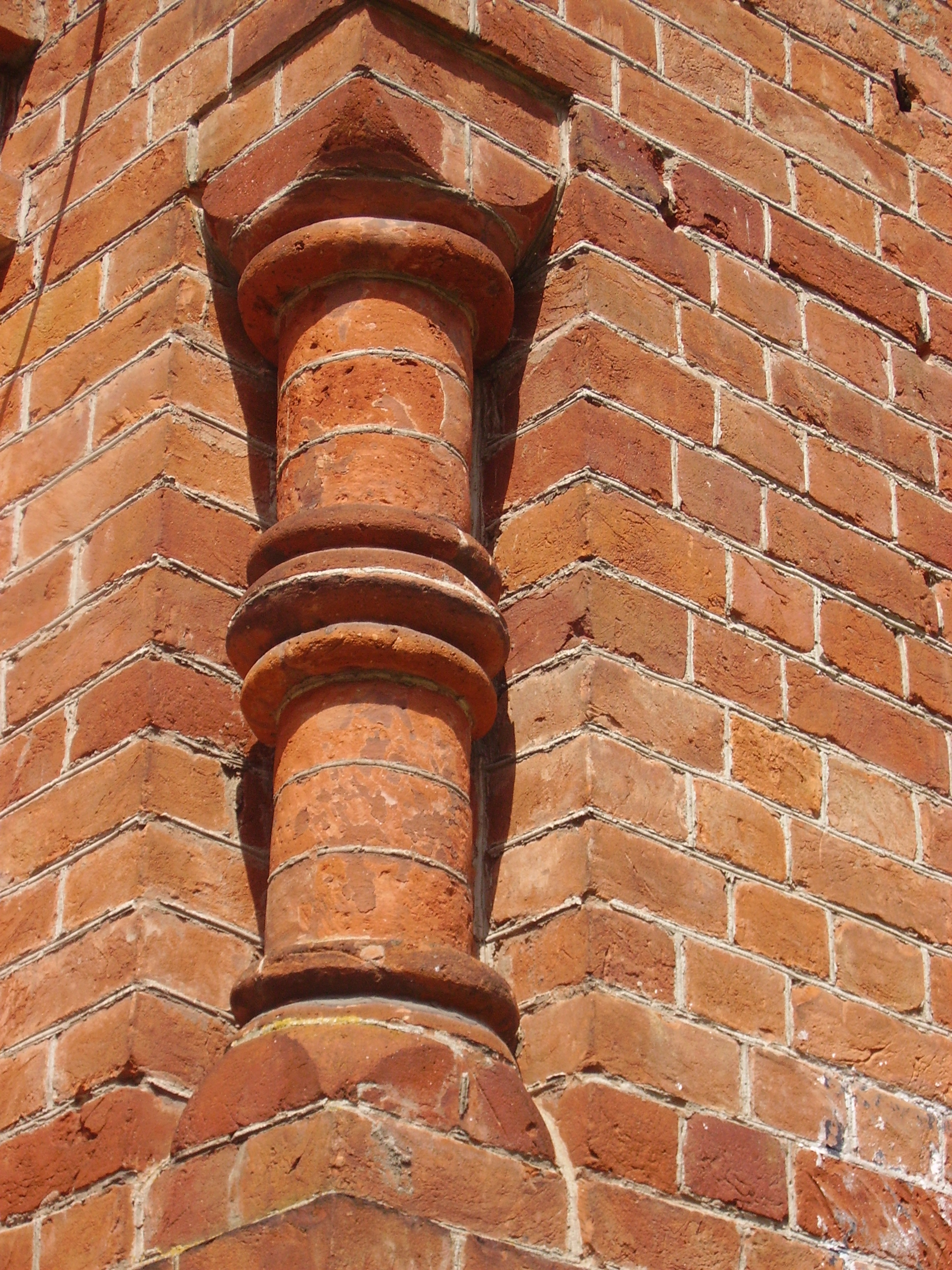
Fort I of Osowiec Fortress (Finishing the walls)
