= Wólka Piaseczna, Podlaskie Voivodeship =

Wólka Piaseczna
- Village
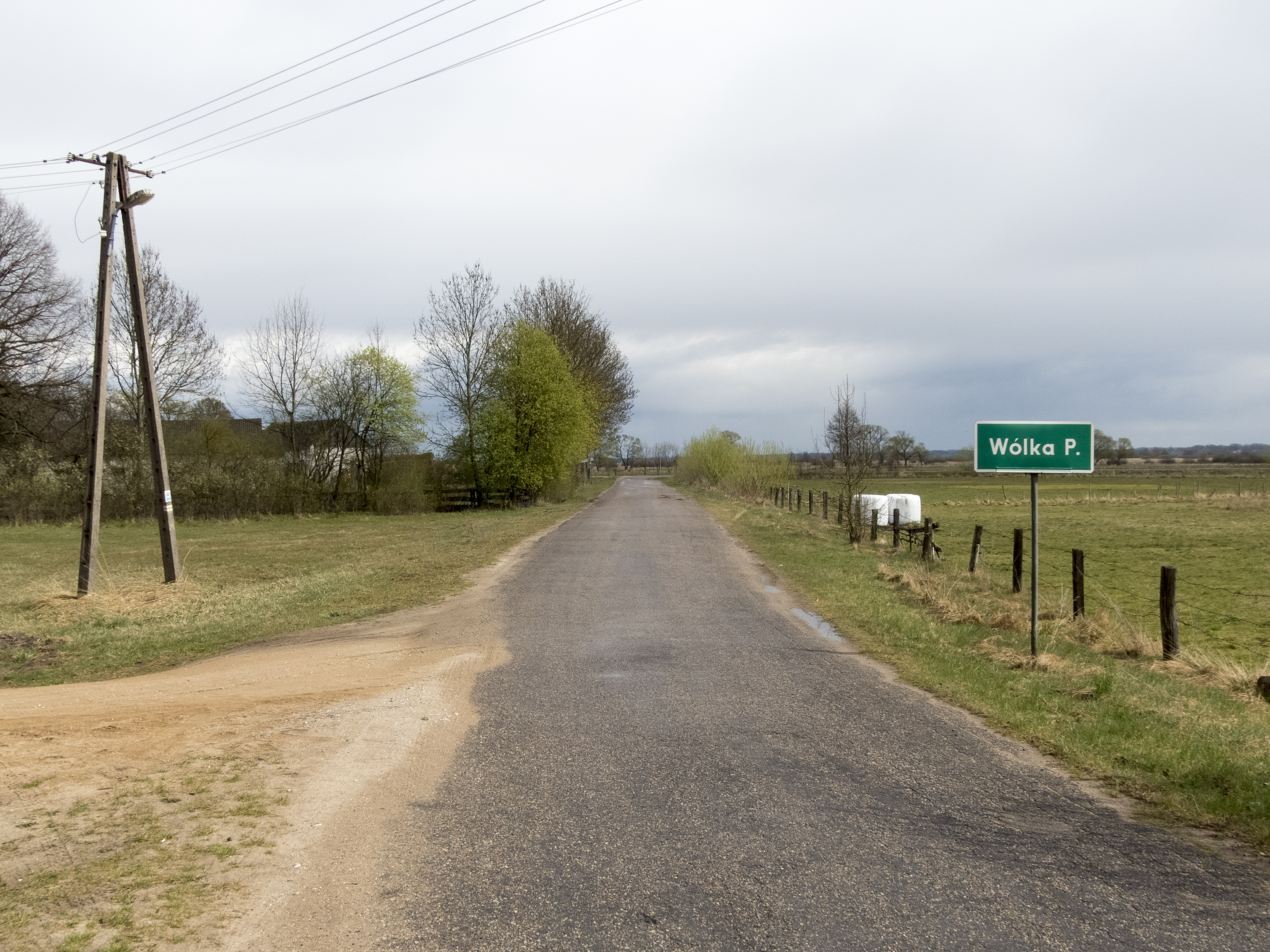

- Location within Poland
- Coordinates: 53°32′N 22°44′E
- Country: Poland
- Voivodeship: Podlaskie
- County: Mońki
- Gmina: Goniądz
- Time zone: UTC+1 (CET)
  - Summer (DST): UTC+2 (CEST)
- Postal code: 19-110
- Vehicle registration: BMN

Wólka Piaseczna [ˈvulka pjaˈsɛt͡ʂna] is a village in the administrative district of Gmina Goniądz, within Mońki County, Podlaskie Voivodeship, in north-eastern Poland.

== History ==
During the German occupation in World War II, between August and September 1944, the village was pacified by Wehrmacht. As a result, some of the residents were transported to work as forced labor, while 8 residents were murdered. Buildings of the village were demolished or burned, while livestock was robbed.
