= Uścianek, Podlaskie Voivodeship =

Uścianek
- Village
- Location within Poland
- Coordinates: 53°26′N 22°37′E
- Country: Poland
- Voivodeship: Podlaskie
- County: Mońki
- Gmina: Goniądz

Uścianek [uɕˈt͡ɕanɛk] is a village in the administrative district of Gmina Goniądz, within Mońki County, Podlaskie Voivodeship, in north-eastern Poland.
