= Piotr Blastus Kmita =

Polish-Lithuanian Protestant printer and writer

Piotr Blastus Kmita (died ca. 1632) was a Polish-Lithuanian Protestant printer and writer from the Grand Duchy of Lithuania in the Polish–Lithuanian Commonwealth. He was associated with the Radziwiłł family. He was printer of the works of Symon Budny. Originally his press was in Vilnius but then he moved to Lubča, under the patronage of the Calvinist hetman Christopher Radziwill.
