= Smogorówka Goniądzka =

- Village
- Location within Poland
- Coordinates: 53°30′35″N 22°52′42″E
- Country: Poland
- Voivodeship: Podlaskie
- County: Mońki
- Gmina: Goniądz
- Population: 120

Smogorówka Goniądzka [smɔɡɔˈrufka ɡɔˈɲɔnt͡ska] is a village in the administrative district of Gmina Goniądz, within Mońki County, Podlaskie Voivodeship, in north-eastern Poland.
