= Downary =

- Village
- Location within Poland
- Coordinates: 53°26′17″N 22°41′17″E
- Country: Poland
- Voivodeship: Podlaskie
- County: Mońki
- Gmina: Goniądz

Downary [dɔvˈnarɨ] is a village in the administrative district of Gmina Goniądz, within Mońki County, Podlaskie Voivodeship, in north-eastern Poland.

At the 2021 census, it had a population of 366 and covered an area of 26.09 km², resulting in a population density of approximately 14 people per square kilometre.
