= Łazy, Podlaskie Voivodeship =

Łazy
- Village
- Location within Poland
- Coordinates: 53°28′10″N 22°41′44″E
- Country: Poland
- Voivodeship: Podlaskie
- County: Mońki
- Gmina: Goniądz

Łazy [ˈwazɨ] is a village in the administrative district of Gmina Goniądz, within Mońki County, Podlaskie Voivodeship, in north-eastern Poland.
