= Mierkienniki =

- Village
- Location within Poland
- Coordinates: 53°27′48″N 22°44′45″E
- Country: Poland
- Voivodeship: Podlaskie
- County: Mońki
- Gmina: Goniądz

Mierkienniki [mjɛrkʲɛnˈniki] is a village in the administrative district of Gmina Goniądz, within Mońki County, Podlaskie Voivodeship, in north-eastern Poland.
