= Biebrza National Park =

National park in Poland

- Polish: Biebrzański Park Narodowy
- IUCN category II (national park)
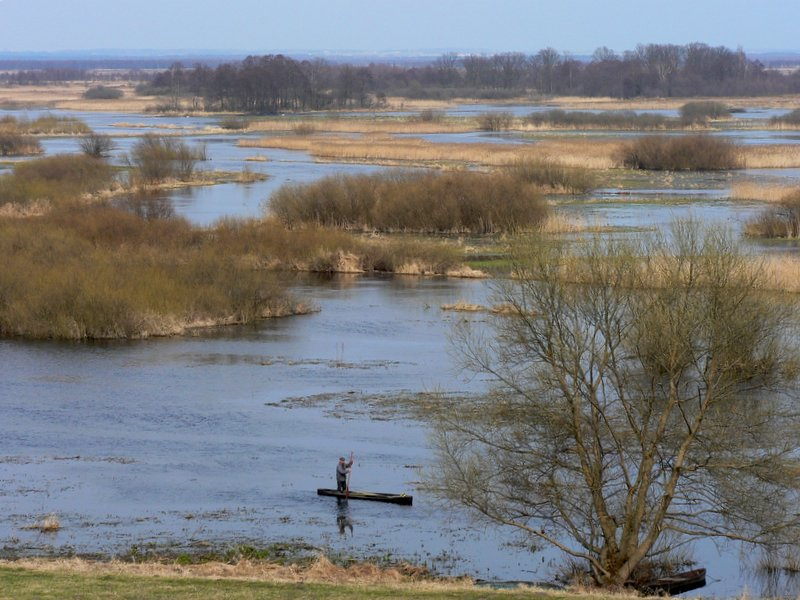
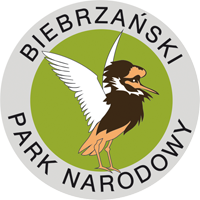
- Biebrza River at Burzyn, Poland Park logo with Ruff

- Location within Poland
- Location: Podlaskie Voivodeship, Poland
- Nearest city: Osowiec-Twierdza
- Coordinates: 53°28′00″N 22°39′41″E
- Area: 592.23 km^{2} (228.66 sq mi)
- Established: 9 September 1993
- Governing body: Ministry of the Environment
- Website: Official website

Ramsar Wetland
- Official name: Biebrzański National Park
- Designated: 24 October 1995
- Reference no.: 756

Biebrza National Park (Polish: Biebrzański Park Narodowy) is a national park in Podlaskie Voivodeship, northeastern Poland, along the Biebrza River.

The largest of Poland's 23 national parks, the Biebrza National Park was created on 9 September 1993. Its total area is 592.23 km^{2} (228.66 sq mi), of which forests cover 155.47 km^{2}, fields and meadows are spread over 181.82 km^{2} and marshes with an area of 254.94 km^{2}.

== Biebrza Marshes ==
The Biebrza Marshes are the most valuable part of the park. Biebrza National Park protects vast and relatively untouched fenlands with a unique variety of several communities of plants, rare wetland birds, and mammals such as elk and beaver. The Biebrza wetlands as well as the Narew River valleys are very important centres for birds' nesting, feeding and resting. In 1995 the park was designated as a wetland site of worldwide significance and is under the protection of the Ramsar Convention.

== Red Marshes ==
The most important part of the park is Red Marsh (Polish: Rezerwat przyrody Czerwone Bagno), which is under strict protection.

The park's headquarters are located at no. 8 in the village of Osowiec-Twierdza, within the grounds of the historic Osowiec Fortress from the 19th century, near Goniądz.

== 2020 April fires ==
On 18 April 2020 a fire broke out that destroyed at least 6,000 hectares of grass and woodland. This fire was caused by illegal grass burning. While usually the fire would have been put out with the onset of the flooding of the grassland, this year's low water level meant that the fire kept on raging until it was finally declared under control on 26 April. It has been the most devastating fire since 1992.

== See also ==
- Carska Droga
