= Budne, Podlaskie Voivodeship =

Budne
- Village
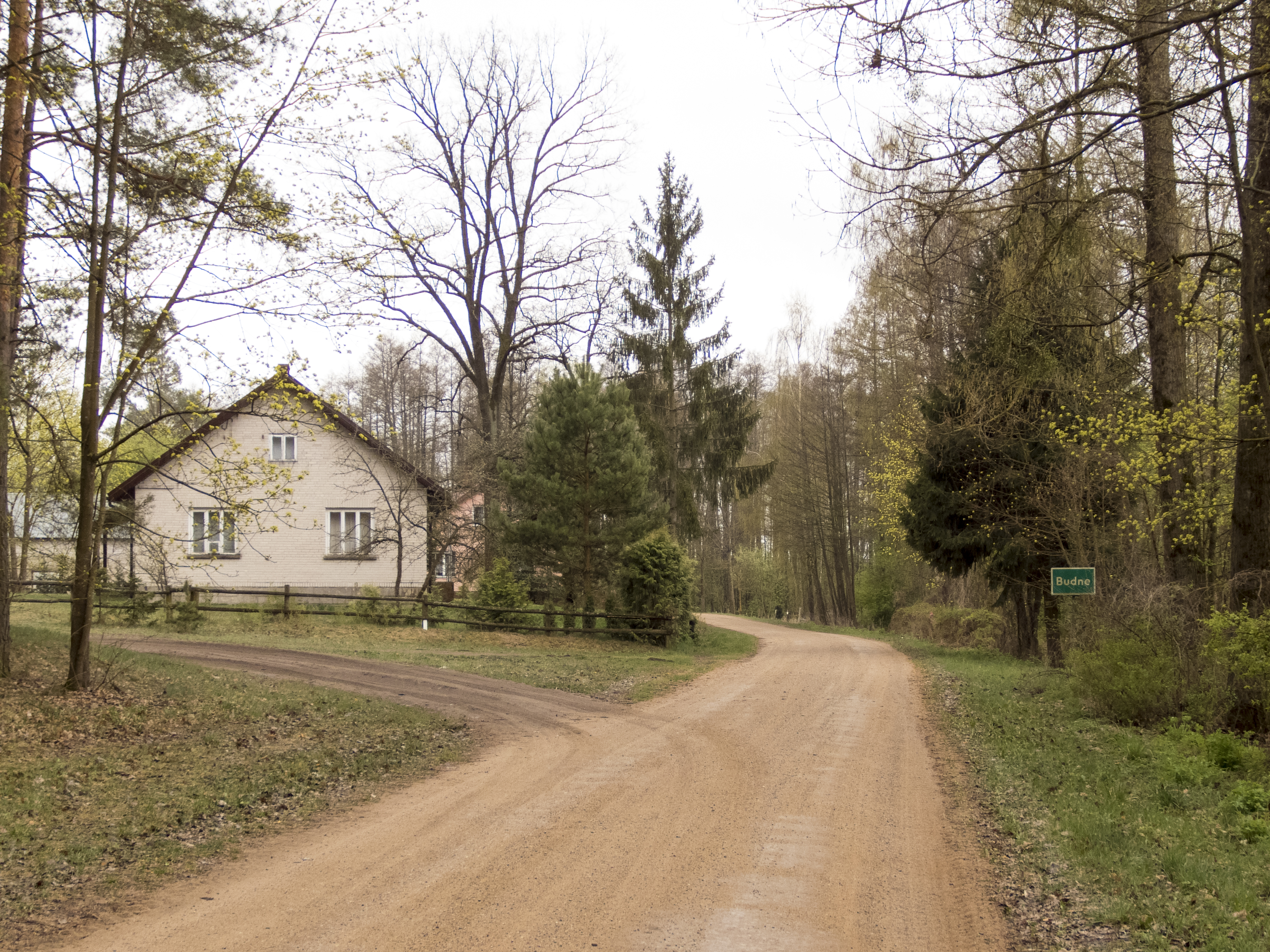

- Location within Poland
- Coordinates: 53°30′N 22°43′E
- Country: Poland
- Voivodeship: Podlaskie
- County: Mońki
- Gmina: Goniądz

Budne [ˈbudnɛ] is a village in the administrative district of Gmina Goniądz, within Mońki County, Podlaskie Voivodeship, in north-eastern Poland.
