= Goniądz =

Town in Poland

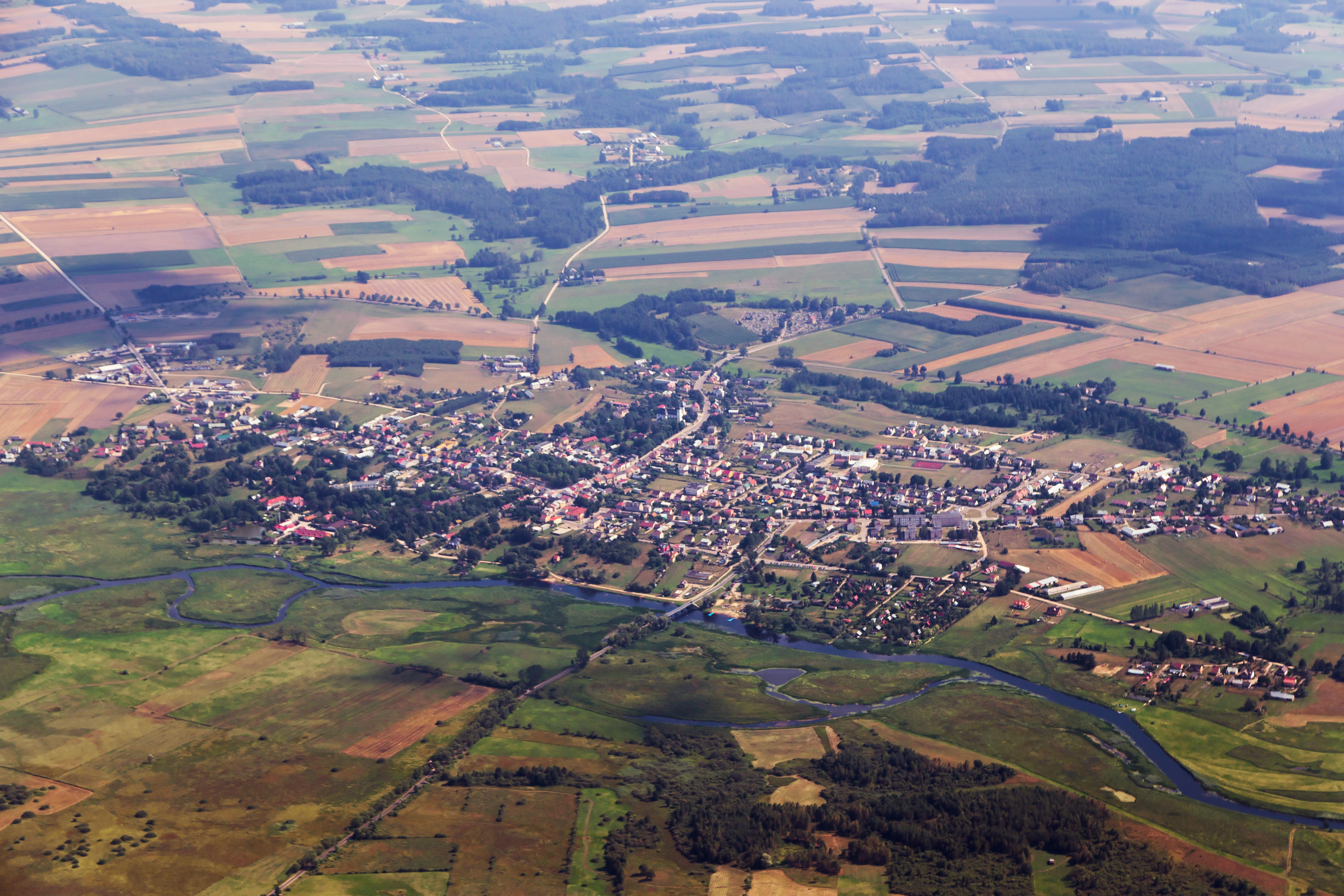
- Birdseye view of Goniądz

- Flag Coat of arms

- Location within Poland
- Coordinates: 53°29′21″N 22°44′16″E
- Country: Poland
- Voivodeship: Podlaskie
- County: Mońki
- Gmina: Goniądz

Area
  - Total: 4.28 km^{2} (1.65 sq mi)

Population (2006)
  - Total: 1,910
  - Density: 446/km^{2} (1,160/sq mi)
- Time zone: UTC+1 (CET)
  - Summer (DST): UTC+2 (CEST)
- Postal code: 19-110
- Vehicle registration: BMN
- Website: http://www.goniadz.pl/

Goniądz ([ˈɡɔɲɔnt͡s]; Yiddish: גאניאנדז, romanized: Goniondzh) is a town in northeastern Poland, located at the Biebrza river, (pop. 1,915) in Mońki County in Podlaskie Voivodeship.

== History ==
The town was founded sometime in the 14th century when dense forests covered the area. The first mention of it dates back to August 14, 1358, when a chronicler noted Goniądz as the seat of a powiat in the Wizna Land. On December 2, 1382, the dukes of Mazovia (Siemowit IV and his brother and co-regent Janusz I) awarded the Wizna castle and surrounding land to the Teutonic Order. The land was bought back from the Teutons in 1402, but at the same time the order also sold it to the Grand Duke of Lithuania. Because of that, the town was disputed by the Kingdom of Poland, Duchy of Masovia and Grand Duchy of Lithuania, with the latter gaining the upper hand for over a century and a half.

Eventually the Polish–Lithuanian union resulted in the town being somewhat of a borderland: owned by noble houses from both sides of the border, with the laws of both states applied. In 1430 Grand Duke of Lithuania Vytautas founded a church there. Other landowners of the town also expanded the small castle, most notably Prince Michael Glinski, Mikołaj II Radziwiłł and Sigismund II Augustus, future king of Poland. In 1547 Goniądz was granted a town charter modeled on Chełmno law. Four years later, King Sigismund Augustus decided that only Polish law would apply in the land surrounding Goniądz, and in 1569 the town was transferred back to Poland and remained within its borders thereafter. It was a royal town of Poland, administratively located in the Bielsk County in the Podlaskie Voivodeship in the Lesser Poland Province.

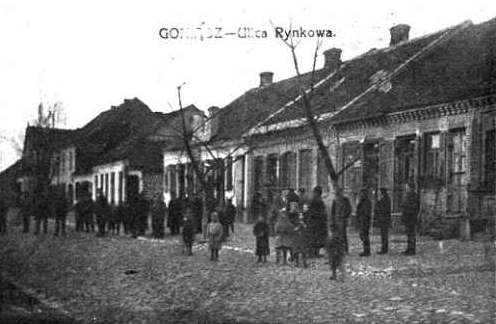
Rynkowa Street before 1939

In 1572 Goniądz became part of the starostship of Knyszyn; the following year the Sejm, or the Polish parliament, confirmed the city charter. The town continued to grow rapidly and in 1579 was granted with the right to trade with salt, one of the most expensive minerals back then. On May 28, 1621, a huge fire destroyed the town, but it was quickly rebuilt and by 1667 became a seat of local administration. By 1765 the town had 243 houses and roughly 1500 inhabitants, mostly Poles, but also Jews and Tatars. In 1775 a new church was erected by bishop of Przemyśl Antoni Betański.

After the Third Partition of Poland in 1795, the town was annexed by the Kingdom of Prussia. In 1807, it passed to the short-lived Polish Duchy of Warsaw, and after its dissolution in 1815, it passed to the Russian Partition of Poland. Due to Russian discriminatory policies, the town became part of the so-called Pale of Settlement and experienced an influx of Jews. After World War I, Poland regained independence and control of Goniądz. According to the 1921 census, the population was 59.7% Polish and 40.3% Jewish.

=== World War II ===
The Germans occupied the town for ten days in September 1939 and burned the synagogue prior to handing the town over to Soviet forces in accordance with the Molotov–Ribbentrop Pact. The town was reoccupied by the Germans on 26 June 1941 and after consulting with the local priest they appointed a collaborationist town council led by Jan Balonowski. On 2 July 1941 after a few Jews were found hiding in surrounding villages, the town council ordered that "All Jews present in nearby villages are ordered to return to town. Any farmers caught harboring a Jew will be shot alongside the Jew". On 4 July, an SS unit arrived in the town, assembled the Jews and humiliated them, and prior to leaving gave the Blue Police a free hand in regards to alleged communists. Some prisoners were released in exchange for payment, but others were tortured or beaten to death. Survivor estimates vary between 20 and 180 dead alleged communists (mainly Jews, some Poles). On 6 July 1941, five Jewish youths were killed by German soldiers after they were caught by the Blue Police outside of town. On 20–21 July 1941, a Polish officer of the Blue Police, probably overseen by a small SS unit, instigated a pogrom in which 20 Jews were killed. Following the pogrom, and threatened with further violence, Jewish women conscripted for labor at the German military command at Osowiec, appealed for help from the local German colonel. The colonel dispatched a German military police unit which arrested and then executed six of the perpetrators for stealing Jewish property.

There were a number of attempts by the Blue Police and subsequently German authorities to set up a closed ghetto, however after being bribed this was not carried out. 14 Jews were executed by the SS in August 1941 after being rounded up by Polish police as suspected communists. Jews were used for forced labor in a number of Wehrmacht enterprises. On 2 November 1942 the SS drove out most of the Jewish inhabitants to a transit camp in the village of Bogusze. From there they were sent to Treblinka extermination camp and Auschwitz concentration camp and most of them were murdered on arrival, 10 Goniądz Jews survived in the extermination camps. Another 10 survived hiding near Goniadz. In May 1944 the Germans arrested and shot dead 3 Jews and the Polish couple that was sheltering them. In 1949 some 10 Polish collaborators were tried together for the murder of 25 Jews on 7 July 1941; one received a life sentence and another a six-year term. In 1950 an additional Polish collaborator received a six-year sentence for a different incident.

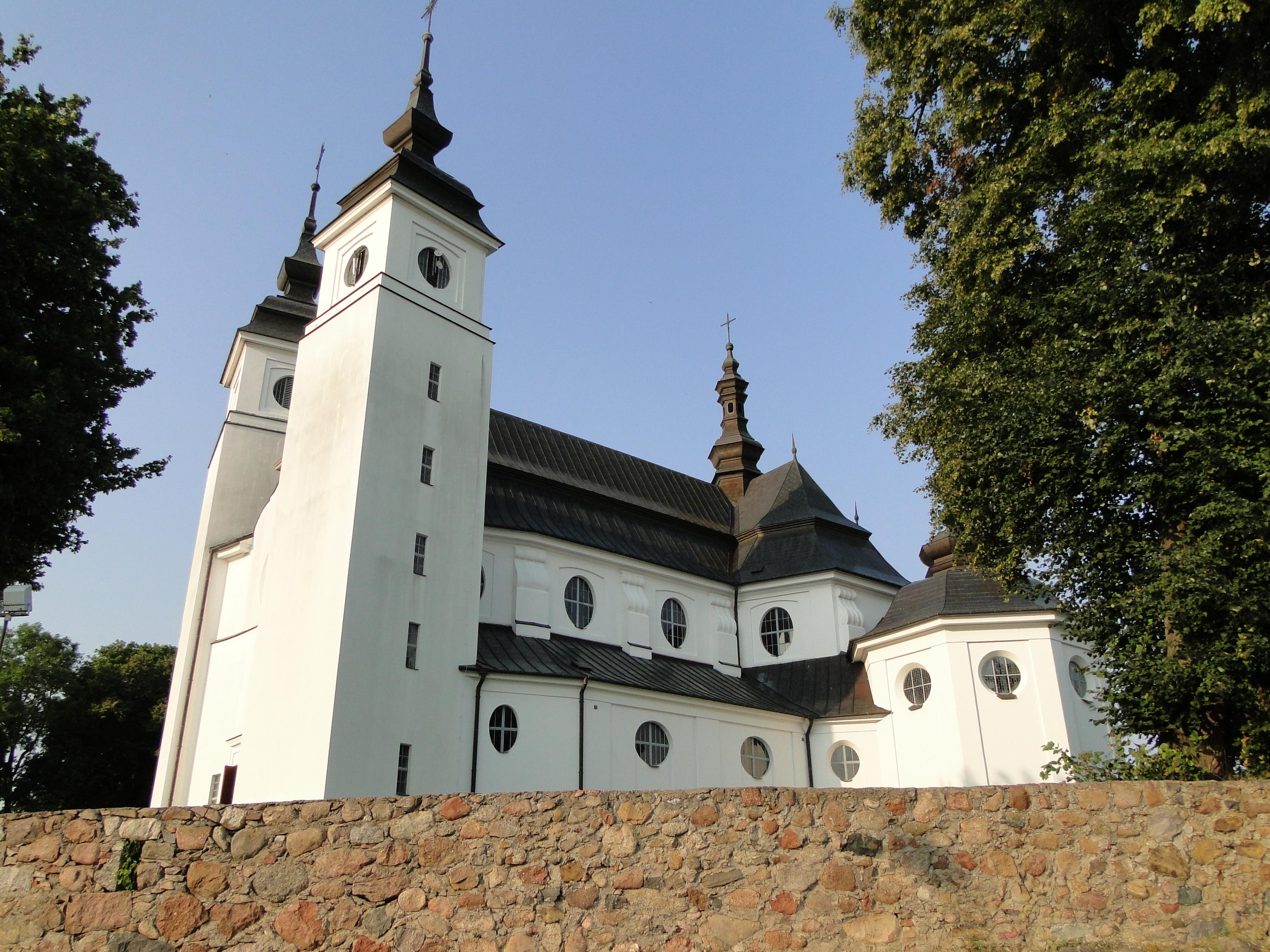
St. Agnes church

80% of the town was destroyed in World War II. After the War, the town was restored to Poland, although with a Soviet-installed communist regime, which stayed in power until the Fall of Communism in the 1980s. The Polish anti-communist resistance was active in Goniądz. In 1945 it raided a local communist police station. The Wiara (Faith) youth resistance organization was founded and based in Goniądz.

After postwar reconstruction, Goniądz became a local agricultural hub and tourist destination.

=== Transport ===
Vovoideship road 670 bypasses Goniądz to the south.

The nearest railway station is in Osowiec.

=== Jewish cemetery ===
The Jewish cemetery was mostly destroyed during World War II. It was created on 24th September 1782 and is located on right side of the road to Downary. Most of the gravestones are missing or damaged. There is currently a restoration project underway by a descendant now living in the U.S. Information signs regarding the cemetery were installed in 2019 and 2024.

Information sign

Typical gravestone
