= Gmina Goniądz =

Gmina Goniądz Goniądz Commune
- Gmina
- Coat of arms

- Gmina Goniądz within the Mońki County
- Coordinates (Goniądz): 53°29′21″N 22°44′16″E
- Country: Poland
- Voivodeship: Podlaskie
- County: Mońki
- Seat: Goniądz

Area
  - Total: 376.68 km^{2} (145.44 sq mi)

Population (2006)
  - Total: 5,209
  - Density: 13.83/km^{2} (35.82/sq mi)
  - Urban: 1,910
  - Rural: 3,299
- Website: https://goniadz.pl/

Gmina Goniądz is an urban-rural gmina (administrative district) in Mońki County, Podlaskie Voivodeship, in north-eastern Poland. Its seat is the town of Goniądz, which lies approximately 11 kilometres (7 mi) north-west of Mońki and 51 km (32 mi) north-west of the regional capital Białystok.

The gmina covers an area of 376.68 square kilometres (145.4 sq mi), and as of 2006 its total population is 5,209 (out of which the population of Goniądz amounts to 1,910, and the population of the rural part of the gmina is 3,299).

== Villages ==
Apart from the town of Goniądz, Gmina Goniądz contains the villages and settlements of Białosuknia, Budne, Budne-Żarnowo, Dawidowizna, Doły, Downary, Klewianka, Kramkówka Duża, Kramkówka Mała, Krzecze, Łazy, Mierkienniki, Olszowa Droga, Osowiec, Owieczki, Piwowary, Płochowo, Smogorówka Dolistowska, Smogorówka Goniądzka, Szafranki, Uścianek, Wojtówstwo, Wólka Piaseczna and Wroceń.

== Neighbouring gminas ==
Gmina Goniądz is bordered by the gminas of Bargłów Kościelny, Grajewo, Jaświły, Mońki, Radziłów, Rajgród, Sztabin and Trzcianne.
