= Michejda =

Michejda is a Polish surname typical for the region of Cieszyn Silesia, where the members of Michejda family were traditionally active in Polish and Lutheran public life. Notable people include:

- Tadeusz Michejda (1879–1956), Polish physician and politician
- Władysław Michejda (1876–1937), Mayor of Cieszyn
