= Białystok Voivodeship =

Białystok Voivodeship may refer to the following administrative districts of Poland:

- Białystok Voivodeship (1919–1939), as defined before World War II
- Białystok Voivodeship (1945–1975), as defined after World War II
- Białystok Voivodeship (1975–1998), as defined after 1975
