= Włodzimierz Sokorski =

Polish politician and writer

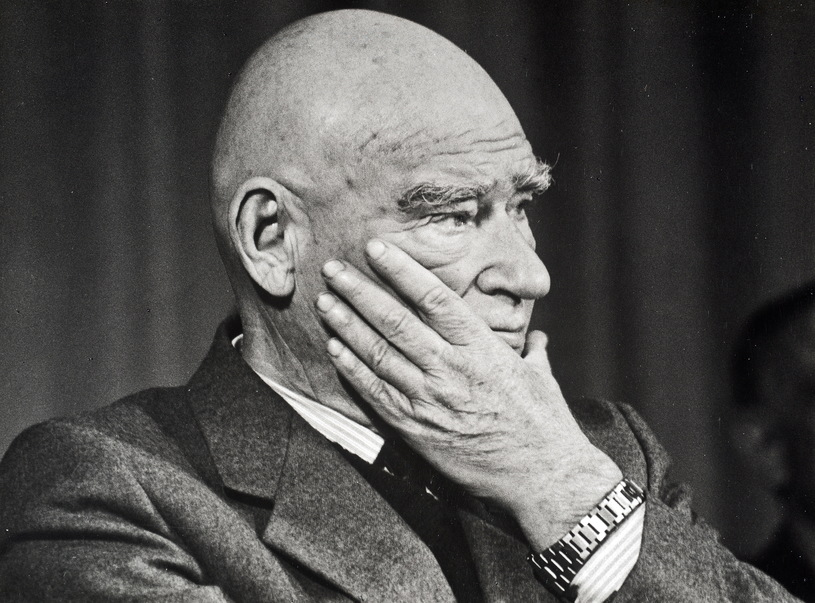
- Sokorski in 1989

Chairman of the Polish Radio and Television
- In office April 1956 – October 1972
- Preceded by: Position created
- Succeeded by: Maciej Szczepański

Minister of Culture and Art
- In office 21 November 1952 – 19 April 1956
- Preceded by: Stefan Dybowski
- Succeeded by: Karol Kuryluk

Personal details
- Born: 2 July 1908 Oleksandrivsk, Russian Empire
- Died: 2 May 1999 (aged 90) Warsaw
- Resting place: Powązki Military Cemetery
- Party: PZPR
- Awards

Military service
- Branch/service: Polish People's Army
- Rank: Generał brygady (Brigadier general)
- Unit: 1st Tadeusz Kościuszko Infantry Division
- Commands: Deputy commander of political and educational affairs
- Battles/wars: Second World War

Włodzimierz Sokorski (2 July 1908 – 2 May 1999) was a Polish communist official, writer, military journalist and a brigadier general in the People's Republic of Poland. He was the Minister of Culture and Art responsible for the implementation of the socialist realist doctrine in Poland. During World War II he escaped to the Soviet Union.

In 1949 at the Congress of Polish Composers in Łagów he banned jazz, after a four-and-a-half-hour diatribe on the "imperialist rot" poisoning people's minds. Following the socialist thaw of the Polish October revolution, Sokorski headed the Polish Radio and Television Committee under the Council of Ministers from 1956 to 1972, and later, the Miesięcznik Literacki ideological monthly magazine (dismantled in 1990). Despite promoting socialist realism and the line of the PZPR, it is emphasized that as the minister of culture and art, he also saved some writers and people of culture from repression.

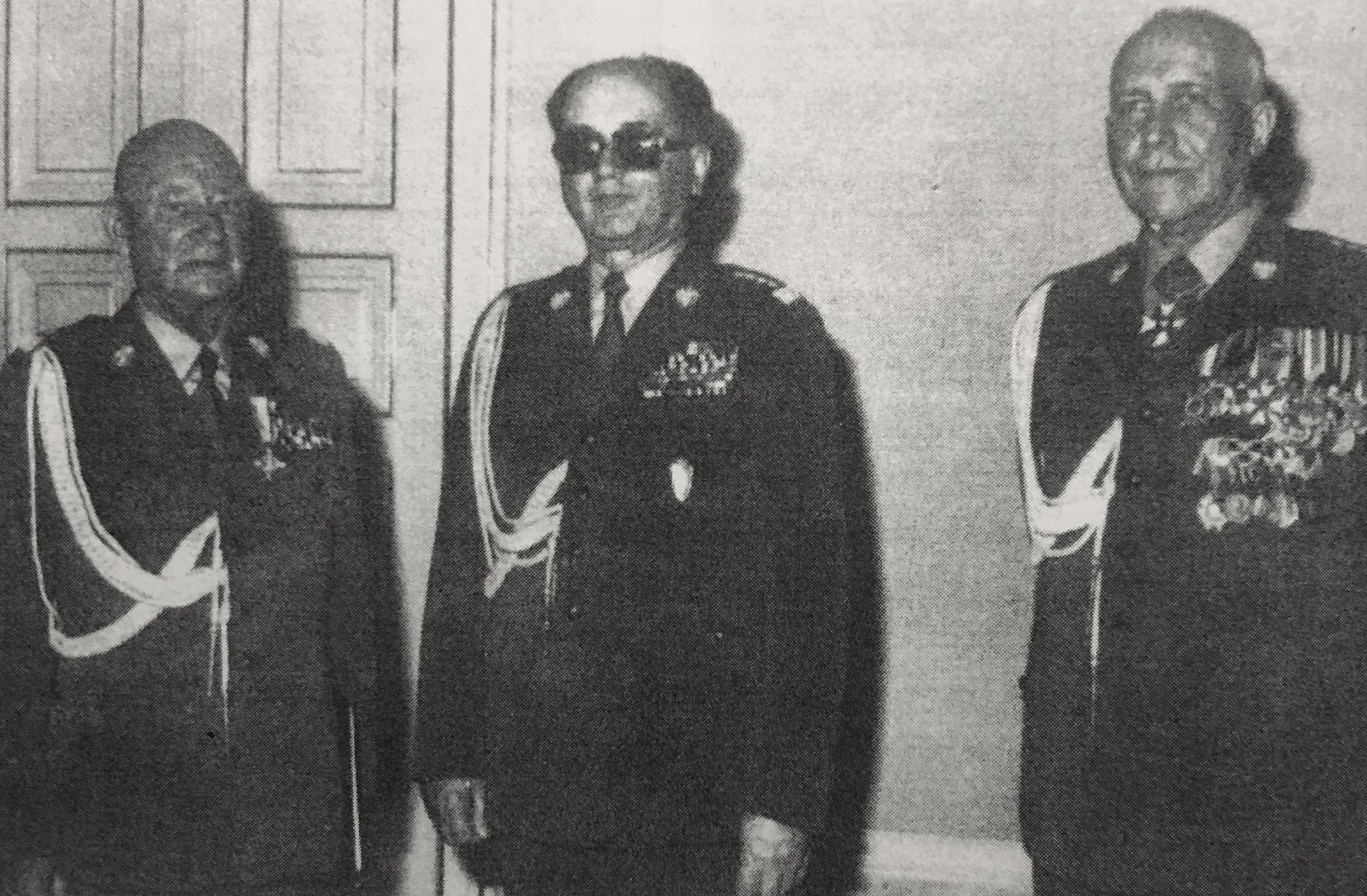
Generals Sokorski, Wojciech Jaruzelski and Zygmunt Huszcza in Belweder, October 1988

He wrote memoirs, novels with strong sexual undertones, and was showered with state medals and awards.

He is buried at the Powązki Military Cemetery in Warsaw.

== Awards and decorations ==
- Order of the Builders of People's Poland (1979)
- Grand Cross of the Order of Polonia Restituta
- Order of the Banner of Labour, 1st Class
- Commander's Cross with Star of the Order of Polonia Restituta (1964)
- Commander's Cross of the Order of Polonia Restituta (1949)
- Gold Cross of Virtuti Militari
- Silver Cross of Virtuti Militari
- Knight's Cross of the Order of Polonia Restituta (1946)
- Lenino Cross (1988)
- Medal of the 30th Anniversary of People's Poland
- Medal of the 40th Anniversary of People's Poland
- Medal of the 10th Anniversary of People's Poland
- Gold Medal of Merit for National Defence
- Medal of Ludwik Waryński (1986)
- Badge of the 1000th Anniversary of the Polish State (1966)
- Order of Lenin (USSR)
- Medal "For the Victory over Germany in the Great Patriotic War 1941–1945" (USSR)
- Jubilee Medal "Twenty Years of Victory in the Great Patriotic War 1941–1945" (USSR)
- Jubilee Medal "Thirty Years of Victory in the Great Patriotic War 1941–1945" (USSR)
- Jubilee Medal "Forty Years of Victory in the Great Patriotic War 1941–1945" (USSR)

== See also ==
- Socialist realism in Poland
