= Białystok Voivodeship (1975–1998) =

Former administrative division of Poland

Białystok Voivodeship Województwo białostockie
- Voivodeship of Poland
- 1975–1998
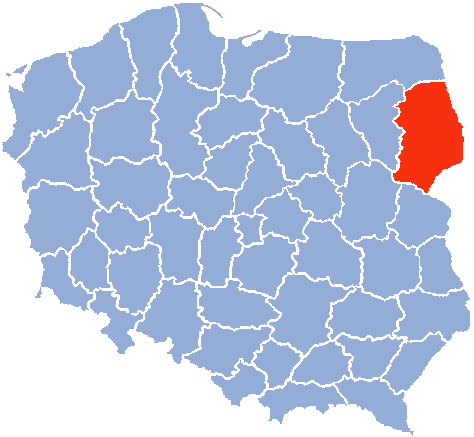
- Location of the Białystok Voivodeship (red) in the People's Republic of Poland or Third Polish Republic.
- Capital: Białystok
- Area
  - Coordinates: 53°08′N 23°09′E
- History
  - Established: 1975
  - Disestablished: 1998
- Political subdivisions: 24 powiaty (counties)
Preceded by	Succeeded by
Białystok Voivodeship (1944–1975)	Podlaskie Voivodeship

Białystok Voivodeship (Polish: Województwo białostockie) was a unit of administrative division and local government in Poland from 1975 to 1998, when it was superseded by the Podlaskie Voivodeship. Its capital city was Białystok. It was formed in 1975 from part of the existing Białystok Voivodeship. The region was 10,055 km^{2} (3,882 sq mi), and its population in 1994, about 700 000 inhabitants. It was divided into 20 cities and 50 municipalities. It bordered with four Voivodeships: Suwałki, Łomża, Siedlce and Biała Podlaska and until 1991 with the Soviet Union (Belorussian SSR), and later with Belarus.

== History ==
Starting 1 June 1975, pursuant to a law proclaimed on 28 May 1975, the Białystok Voivodeship was formed from part of the existing Białystok Voivodeship. In addition the intermediate administrative level of powiats were eliminated, but the secondary administrative units of gminas were retained. The unstated reason for the 1975 reform was the desire of the Polish Central Committee to strengthen control over lower layers of the state apparatus. After Edward Gierek replaced Władysław Gomułka as first secretary of the Polish United Workers' Party, his clique maintained power by dividing the Politburo. Through administrative reorganization and the new territorial division, Gierek was able to nominate his supporters to provincial committees and break the hold of older elements of the party.

After the fall of the People's Republic of Poland, District Offices (Polish: Urząd Rejonowy) were established in the voivodeship under the Act of 22 March 1990 and the Regulation of the Minister – Head of the Office of the Council of Ministers on 1 August 1990. Within the limits of the district offices were several gmina. The offices did not constitute organs of self-government, but performed the tasks and powers of the voivodeship administration.

During 1991 and 1992 the large municipalities were restructured, significantly changing the division of powers between the voivodeship cities and the surrounding rural gminas.

In the Polish administrative reform of 1999 Poland introduced a further reform of local government administration, disestablishing the Białystok Voivodeship effective 31 December 1998 and establishing the Podlaskie Voivodeship.

== Politics ==
Secretaries of the Voivodeship Committee of the Polish United Workers' Party:

Name	Term
Władysław Juszkiewicz	19 May 1975 - 30 October 1980
Stefan Zawodziński	October 1980 - April 1983
Włodzimierz Kołodziejuk	11 April 1983 - December 1989

Voivodes:

Name	Term
Zygmunt Sprycha	1972–1980
Kazimierz Dunaj	1980–1986
Marian Gała	1986–1990

Chairmen of the Voivodeship National Council Presidium (Polish: Przewodniczący Prezydium WRN w Białymstoku):

Name	Term
Władysław Juszkiewicz	1975-1980
Marian Kukla	1980-1984
Marian Szamatowicz	29.6.1984 - 24.4.1990

== Administrative divisions ==
From 1975 until 1990 the voivodeship was solely divided into Gmina of the following types:

- urban gmina (Polish: gmina miejska) consisting of the cities of: Białystok, Bielsk Podlaski, Brańsk, Hajnówka and Siemiatycze
- rural gmina (Polish: gmina wiejska) consisting of villages and countryside of: Bielsk Podlaski, Boćki, Brańsk, Orla, Rudka, Wyszki, Białowieża, Czeremcha, Czyże, Dubicze Cerkiewne, Hajnówka, Kleszczele, Narew, Narewka, Jasionówka, Jaświły, Knyszyn, Krypno, Mońki, Drohiczyn, Dziadkowice, Grodzisk, Mielnik, Milejczyce, Nurzec-Stacja, Siemiatycze, Dąbrowa Białostocka, Janów, Korycin, Krynki, Kuźnica, Nowy Dwór, Sidra, Sokółka, Suchowola, Szudziałowo, Choroszcz, Czarna Białostocka, Dobrzyniewo Kościelne, Gródek, Juchnowiec Dolny, Łapy, Michałowo, Poświętne, Supraśl, Suraż, Turośń Kościelna, Tykocin, Wasilków and Zabłudów

In 1990 the Voivodeship set up a number of District offices (Polish: Urząd Rejonowy):

- Białystok for the gminas of: Choroszcz, Czarna Białostocka, Dobrzyniewo Kościelne, Gródek, Juchnowiec Dolny, Łapy, Michałowo, Poświętne, Supraśl, Suraż, Turośń Kościelna, Tykocin, Wasilków and Zabłudów along with the City of Białystok
- Bielsk Podlaski for the gminas of: Bielsk Podlaski, Boćki, Brańsk, Orla, Rudka and Wyszki along with the Cities of Bielsk Podlaski and Brańsk
- Hajnówka for the gminas of: Białowieża, Czeremcha, Czyże, Dubicze Cerkiewne, Hajnówka, Kleszczele, Narew and Narewka along with the City of Hajnówka
- Mońki for the Gminas: Jasionówka, Jaświły, Knyszyn, Krypno and Mońki
- Siemiatycze for the gminas of: Drohiczyn, Dziadkowice, Grodzisk, Mielnik, Milejczyce, Nurzec-Stacja and Siemiatycze along with the City of Siemiatycze
- Sokółka for the gminas of: Dąbrowa Białostocka, Janów, Korycin, Krynki, Kuźnica, Nowy Dwór, Sidra, Sokółka, Suchowola and Szudziałowo

== Cities and towns ==
Major cities and towns (population in December 1998):

- Białystok – 283 937
- Bielsk Podlaski – 27 594
- Hajnówka – 24 170
- Łapy – 23 320
- Sokółka – 20 096
- Siemiatycze – 15 632
- Mońki – 10 990
- Czarna Białostocka – 9 951
- Wasilków – 8 102
- Dąbrowa Białostocka – 6 633
- Choroszcz – 5 136
- Supraśl – 4 783
- Brańsk – 3 752
- Knyszyn – 2 980
- Zabłudów – 2 204
- Suchowola – 2 500
- Drohiczyn – 2 230
- Tykocin – 2 069
- Kleszczele – 1 653
- Suraż – 992

=== Population ===
Year	1975	1980	1985	1990	1995	1998
Population	618,000	641,100	671,400	692,800	700,700	701,400

== See also ==
- Białystok Voivodeship (1919–1939)
- Białystok Voivodeship (1945–1975)
