= Stanisław Krupka =

Polish activist and politician

Voivode of Białystok Voivodeship
- In office 10 February 1947 – 31 August 1948
- Preceded by: Stefan Dybowski
- Succeeded by: Julian Horodecki

Personal details
- Born: 22 April 1900 Zimna, Congress Poland
- Died: 24 March 1977 (aged 76) Anin, Warsaw, Polish People's Republic
- Resting place: Anin Cemetery
- Party: United People's Party
- Other political affiliations: Polish People's Party "Wyzwolenie"
- Awards: Order of Polonia Restituta; Cross of Independence; Cross of Merit with Swords; Medal of the Tenth Anniversary of Regained Independence; Medal for Long Service; Badge of the 1000th Anniversary of the Polish State; Badge of Honour "For Merit to Warsaw"

Stanisław Krupka (born April 22, 1900 - March 24, 1977) was a Polish social activist, mayor of the Wawer commune (from 1939), chairman of the District National Council in Warsaw (1945–1947) and Voivode of Białystok Voivodeship in 1947–1948.

== Biography ==
He came from a peasant family, the son of Stanisław and Teofila née Nietupska. His mother came from Łączki, and his male line came from the villages of Łacha and Kolimagi.

Stanisław Krupka attended primary school in Leman, then completed three years of high school in Ostrów Mazowiecka. From 1917, he attended the State Teachers' Seminary in Łomża.

He was active in the Academic Union of Independent People's Youth. From 1917 to 1918, he was a member of the Polish Military Organization. In 1920, he participated in the Polish plebiscite in Warmia and Mazury, including in Pisz.

He began working as a teacher in his native Kolno County. In 1923, he was transferred to Warsaw for official duties. He graduated from the Higher Teacher Training Course in Warsaw and the Academy of Political Sciences.

In 1923, he joined the Polish People's Party "Wyzwolenie" (Liberation). In 1924, together with peasant activists, he organized a Kurpie invasion of Kolno in protest against the high taxes imposed on residents by the Kolno County Starost and police attacks on those who opposed the taxes. The case ended in a trial in 1925. The Kurpie defendants were released, the taxes were withdrawn, and the Starost was dismissed from his position. It was one of the largest peasant revolts in interwar Poland. After this event, public trust in Krupka increased.

From 1925 to 1926, he was a member of the Supreme Council of the Polish People's Party "Wyzwolenie". At the same time, he was a member of the Board of the Polish Teachers' Union. He was active in the Holiday and Tourism Committee of the Main Board of the Polish Teachers' Union, organizing holiday camps for workers and tourist and sightseeing trips.

In 1926, he left "Wyzwolenie" and became active in the Independent Peasant Party. He led its structures in the Łomża County. After the party was banned, he returned to the PSL "Wyzwolenie". He was an active member of the party's district boards in Kolno and Łomża and president of the party's district board in Ostrołęka. In subsequent years, he studied at the Free University.

In 1930, he unsuccessfully ran for a parliamentary seat in the Łomża-Kolno district as a candidate from the Union for the Defense of Law and People's Freedom. In 1935, as part of repression for his socio-political activities, he lost his teaching position in the Kurpie region.

He moved to Warsaw and began teaching in Powsin. In July 1939, he was elected mayor of the Wawer commune. He held this position throughout the occupation. He was involved in the resistance movement with the rank of senior sergeant and collaborated with the Peasant Battalions as an educational instructor. He provided assistance to members of the underground resistance. and to people of Jewish origin in collaboration with Janusz Korczak. He also helped artists. In December 1939, he was one of the few detained by the Germans in Wawer who avoided mass execution. In 1943, he established a regional museum of memorabilia in Wawer and proposed, and then oversaw, the establishment of a recreational park in Wawer on the site of a former Russian defensive fort (with the permission of the occupation authorities). The park exists to this day under the name of My Mother's Park.

During the fighting for Warsaw, he broke through the front and in September 1944, he reported to the Polish Committee of National Liberation in Lublin. In September 1944, he was elected by the Polish Committee of National Liberation as the first starosta of Warsaw County. From 1945 to 1947, he served as chairman of the Powiat National Council in Warsaw, after which he was appointed Voivode of Białystok Voivodeship. He held this position from August 1, 1947, to May 1948. Following the administrative reform and the liquidation of the Warsaw district (1952), he served on committees of the District National Council of the Praga-Południe district of Warsaw. He was a member of the Front of National Unity. He was active in the Marysin Wawerski Estate Council. He co-founded the Society of Friends of the Łomża Region in Warsaw and was president of the Warsaw branch of the Society of Friends of Children.

After World War II, he continued his involvement in the peasant movement. In September 1944, he became a member of the People's Party "Wola Ludu" and in 1949 of the United People's Party. He was delegated by the Minister of Public Administration to the territories of the former East Prussia and Gdańsk. He was a member of the Supreme Council and the Audit Committee of the Warsaw Committee of the United People's Party. He was vice-chairman of the Praga-Południe District Committee of the ZSL and a member of the Historical Commission of the Warsaw Committee of the ZSL. On April 30, 1951, he was expelled from the party, but was rehabilitated on November 17, 1956, with the restoration of his membership rights. In the years 1957–1962, he was a member of the ZSL Warszawa-Praga Południe district committee. He died in Anin and was buried at the local cemetery.
