= Suraż =

Town in Podlaskie Voivodeship, Poland

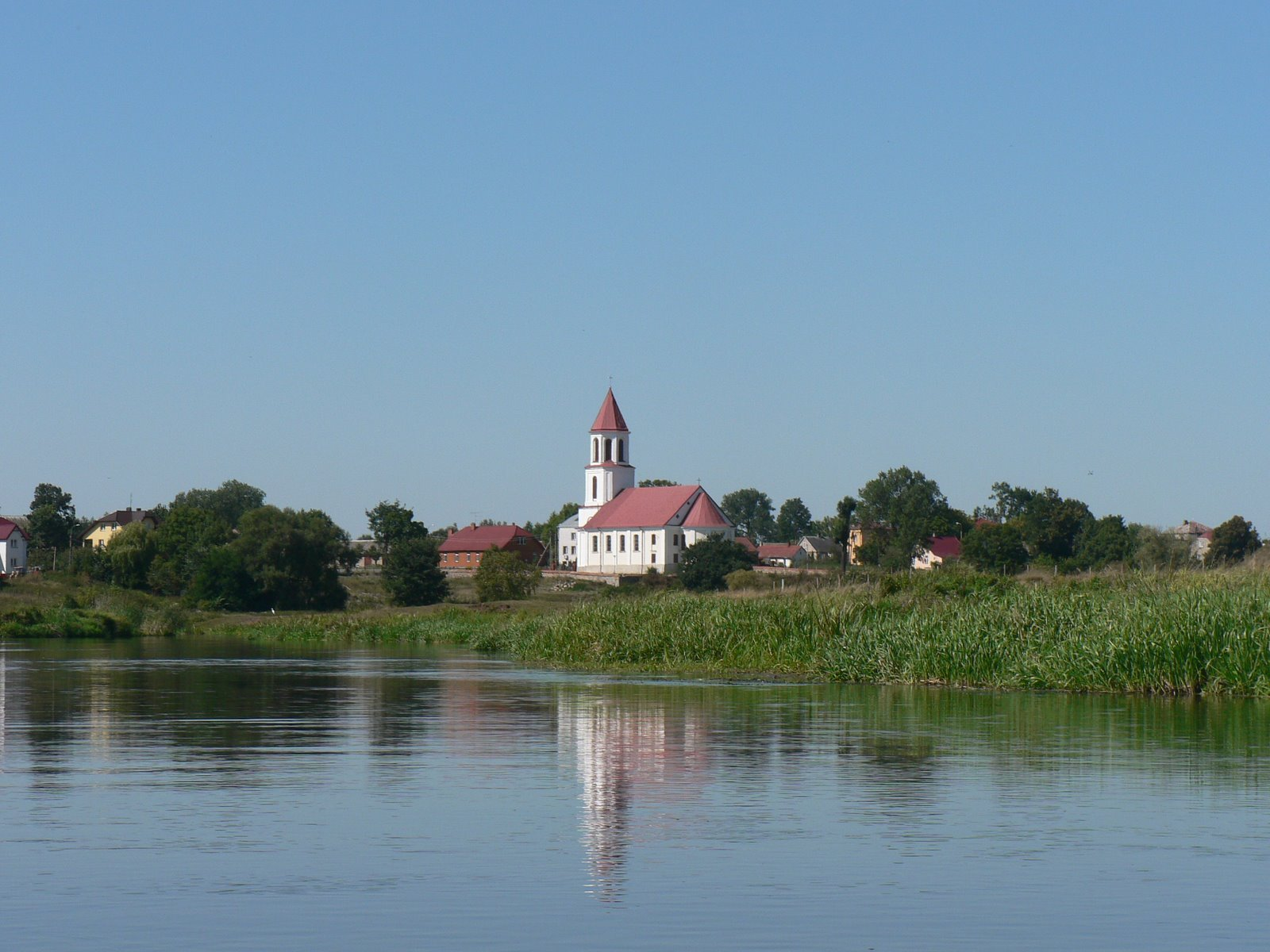
- Church of Corpus Christi in Suraż seen from the Narew riverside

- Coat of arms

- Location within Poland
- Coordinates: 52°57′19″N 22°57′19″E
- Country: Poland
- Voivodeship: Podlaskie
- County: Białystok
- Gmina: Suraż

Area
  - Total: 33.86 km^{2} (13.07 sq mi)

Population (2012)
  - Total: 1,012
  - Density: 29.89/km^{2} (77.41/sq mi)
- Time zone: UTC+1 (CET)
  - Summer (DST): UTC+2 (CEST)
- Postal code: 18-105
- Vehicle registration: BIA
- Website: http://www.suraz.pl/

Suraż [ˈsuraʂ] is a town in north-eastern Poland situated in the Podlaskie Voivodeship, seat of Gmina Suraż in the Białystok County.

Suraż, which has a long and rich history, and was a royal town in the Kingdom of Poland, currently is one of the smallest municipalities of the country, with a population of only 1,012 (as of June 30, 2012).

== History ==
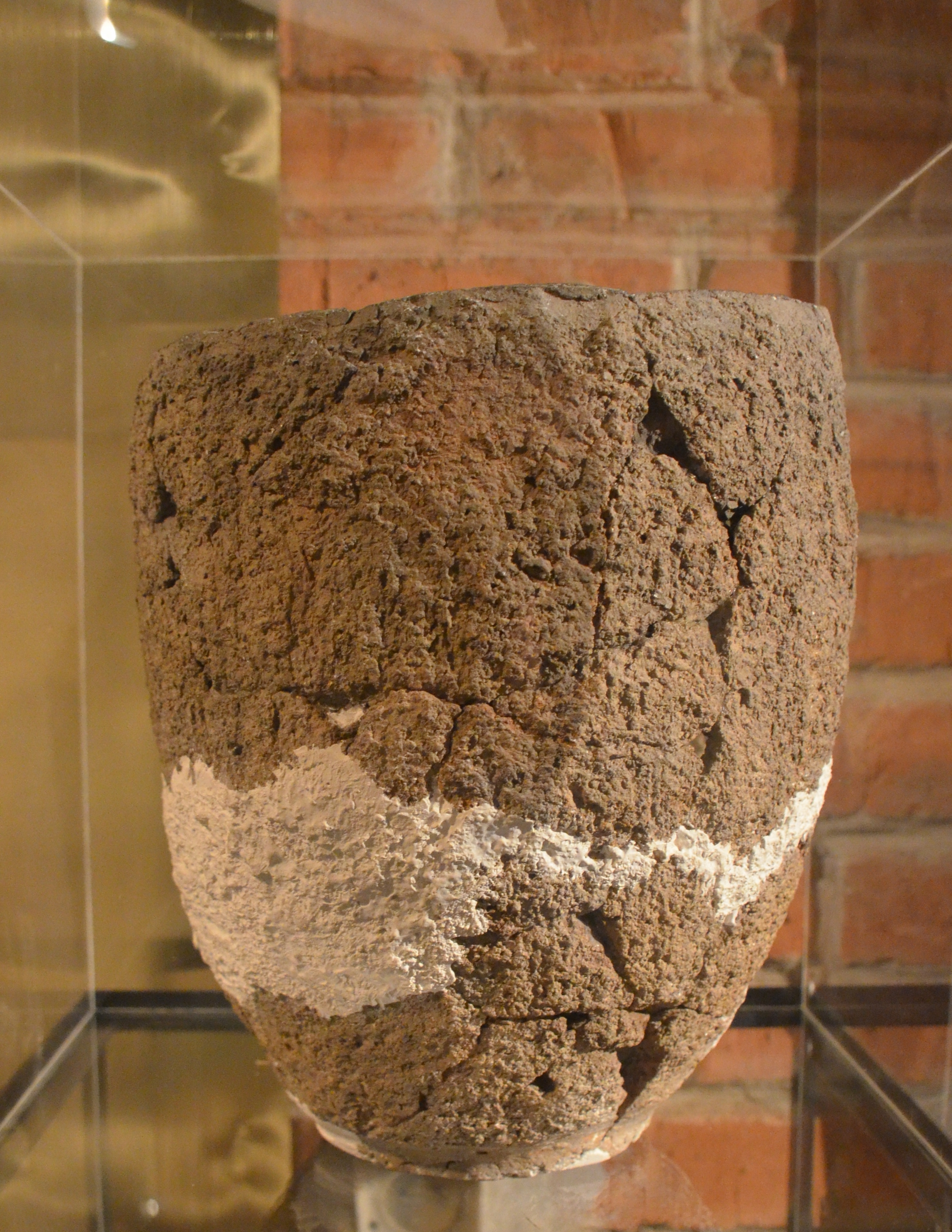
Clay vessel from Suraż, 8th–4th century B.C.

The history of Suraż dates back to the 11th century, when a defensive gord was established on the right bank of the Narew river. In 1390, King Władysław II Jagiełło handed Suraż, together with other towns in the area, to Mazovian Duke Janusz I of Warsaw. The Suraź Castle is mentioned in a 1392 Teutonic Knights chronicle, when it was destroyed by forces of Grand Master Engelhard Rabe. Some time in the late 15th century, a new castle was built, with a brick tower, and a prison. The castle was destroyed during the Swedish invasion of Poland (1655-1660).

Suraż received Magdeburg rights on September 16, 1445, from King Casimir IV Jagiellon. In 1520, it became seat of a powiat in the Land of Bielsk Podlaski, and in 1569, following the Union of Lublin, Suraż was transferred back to the Kingdom of Poland. It was a royal town of Poland, administratively located in the Bielsk County in the Podlaskie Voivodeship in the Lesser Poland Province. The town was inhabited by three communities - Polish, Jewish and Ruthenian.

Following the Third Partition of Poland, in 1795, the town was annexed by Prussia, and made part of the newly formed province of New East Prussia. On defeat of Prussia by Napoleon in 1807 at the following Treaty of Tilsit the area was part of the territory ceded to the Russian Empire. Its area was one of the centers of the Polish January Uprising of 1863–1864. A Polish insurgent unit entered the town and fought a victorious battle against the Russians already on the night of January 22–23, 1863, shortly after the uprising broke out. Further clashes took place on February 8, 1863 and May 13–14, 1863. After the rebellion, the Russians imposed heavy taxes on its residents, and the population of the town rapidly declined. Furthermore, construction of the Saint Petersburg–Warsaw Railway (1862) bypassed Suraż, which deepened its decline. During World War I, the town was occupied by Germany. After the war, Poland regained independence and control of the town. According to the 1921 Polish census, the population was 94.2% Polish and 5.6% Jewish.

Following the joint German-Soviet invasion of Poland, which started World War II in September 1939, the town was occupied by the Soviet Union until 1941, and then by Germany until 1944. Two local Polish policemen were murdered by the Russians in the Katyn massacre in 1940. The town had 40 Jews in 1939, and those who remained were sent to the Białystok Ghetto in 1941, and from there to be murdered at Treblinka in 1943. After the war, the town was restored to Poland.

From 1944 to 1975, it was administratively part of the "large" Białystok Voivodeship, and then from 1975 to 1998, it was part of the "small" Białystok Voivodeship.

== Demographics ==
Historical population
Year	Pop.	±%
1878	1,119	—
1921	1,180	+5.5%
1931	1,379	+16.9%
1950	1,067	−22.6%
1960	1,113	+4.3%
2010	1,007	−9.5%

== Gallery ==
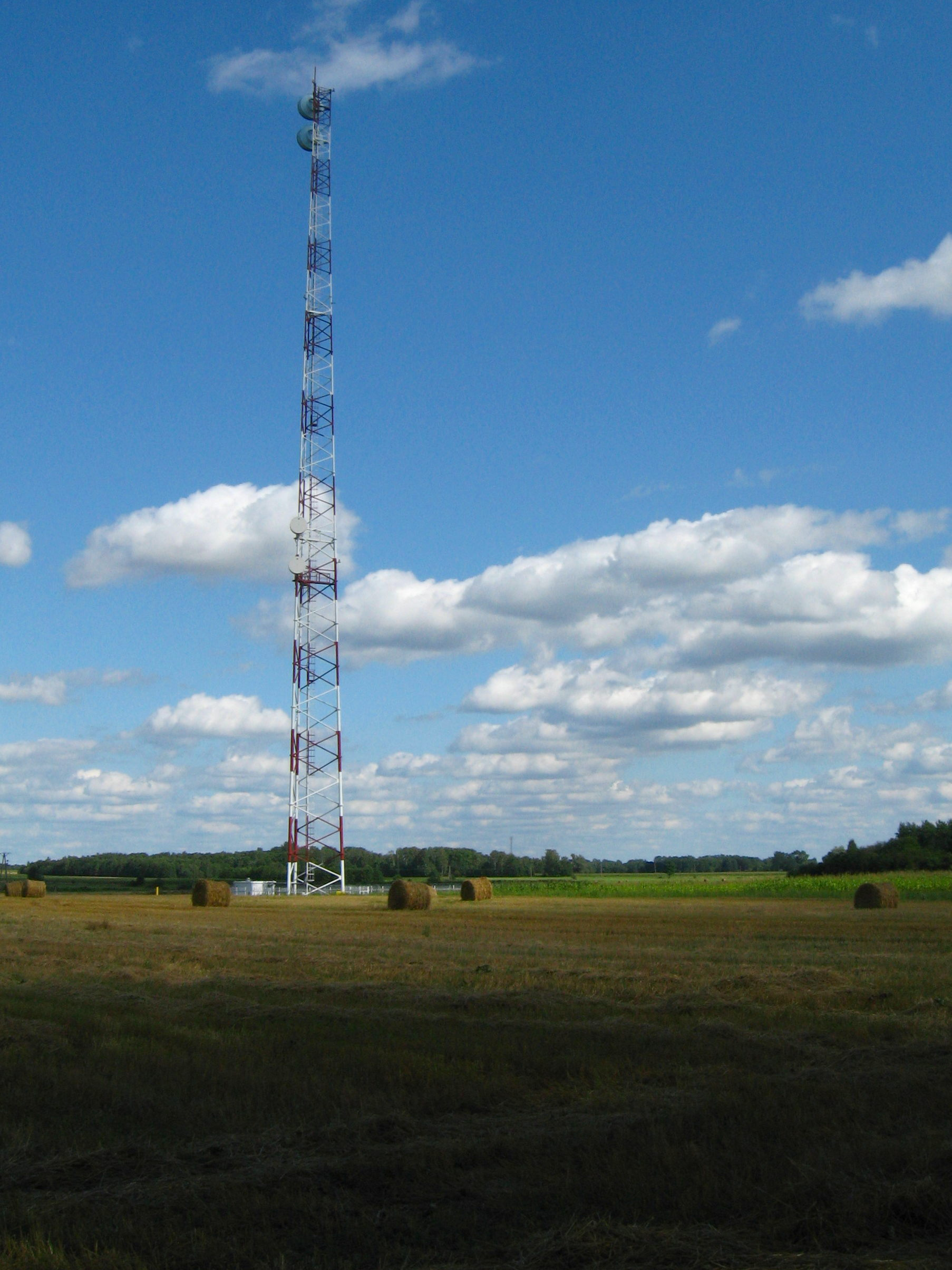
100-metre tall radio relay link tower south of Suraż at 52°56'3"N 22°57'3"E

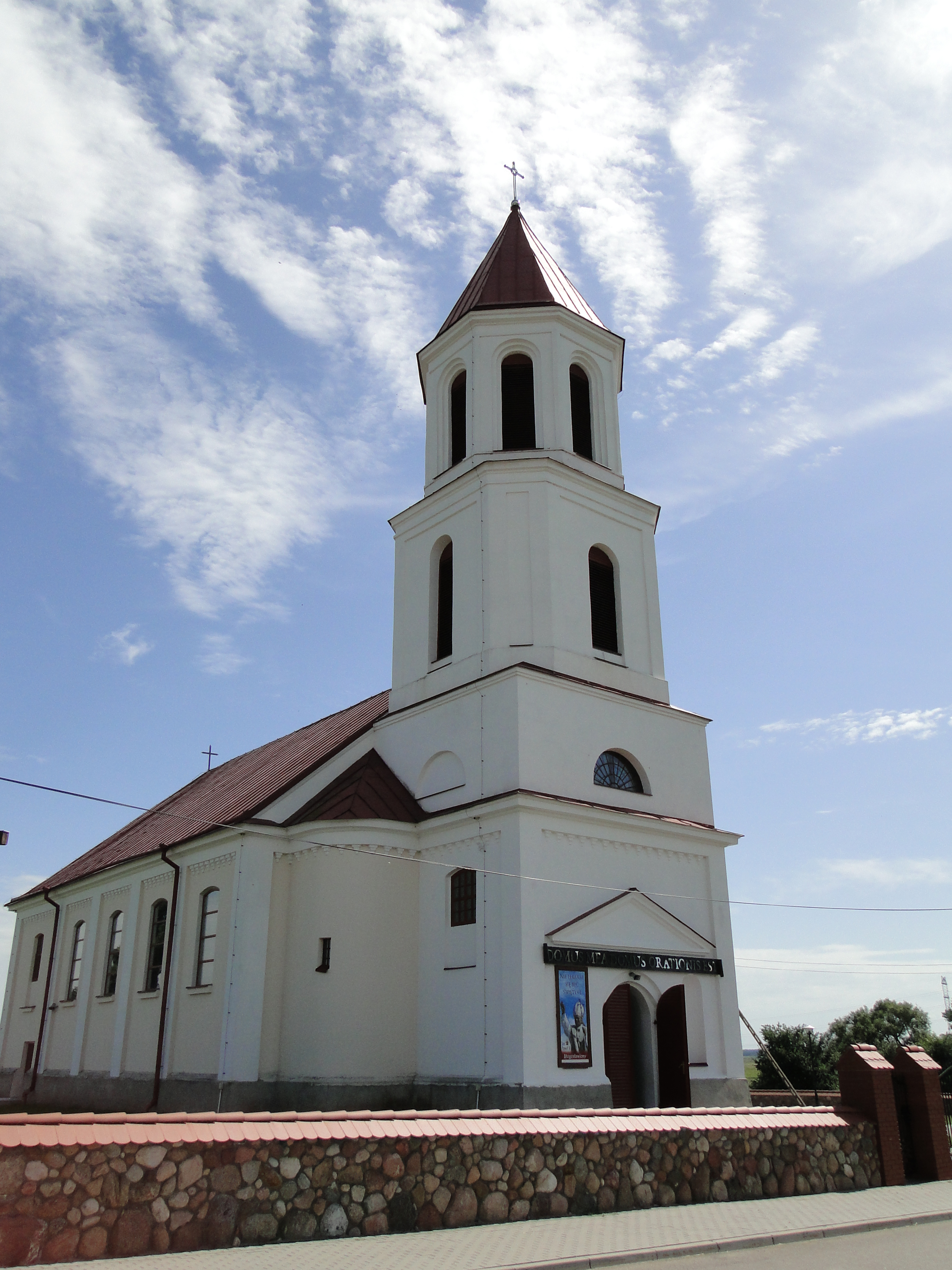
Corpus Christi church

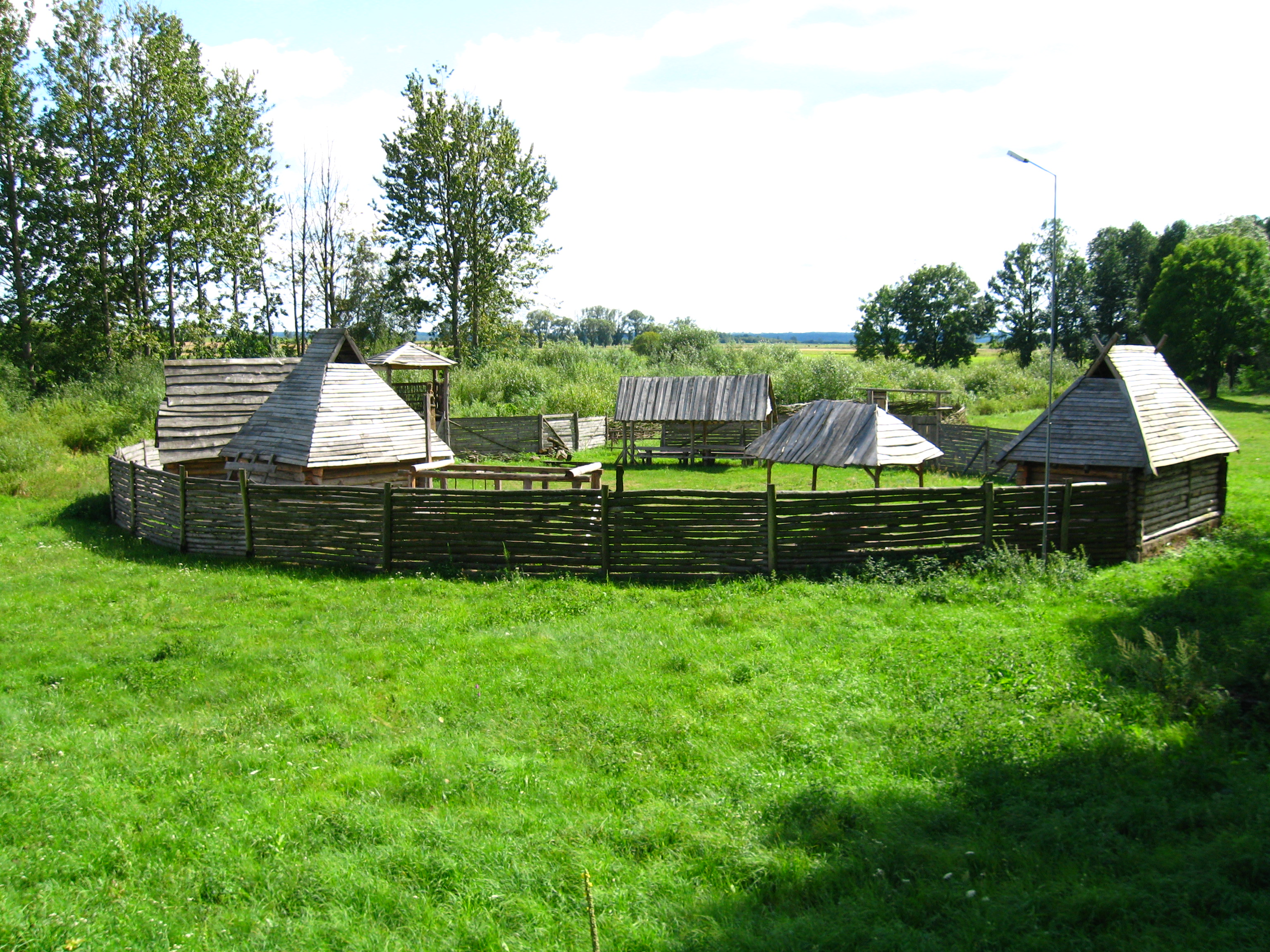
Early medieval Slavic settlement

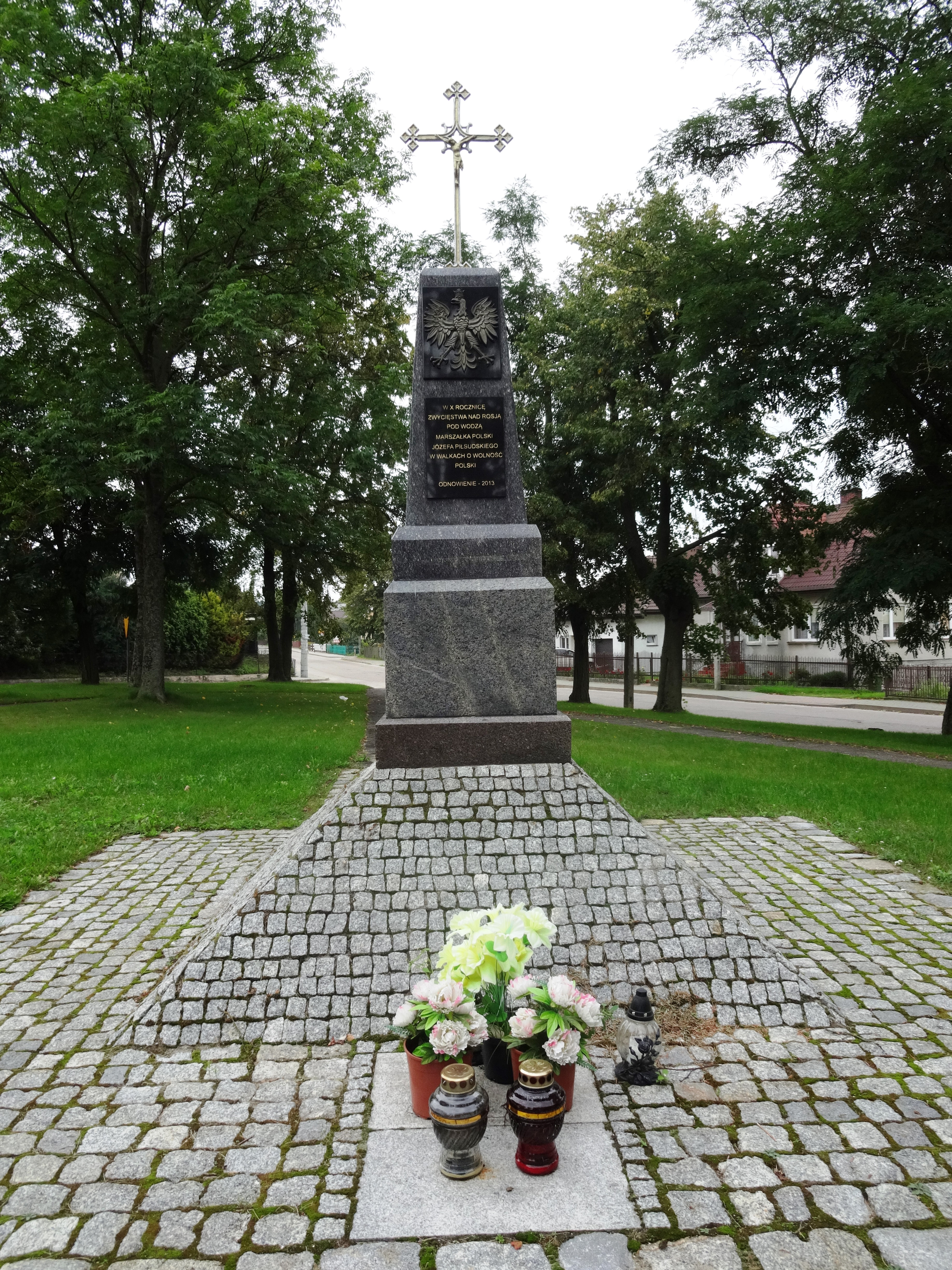
Monument to the Victory over Russia in 1920
