= Julian Horodecki =

Polish politician

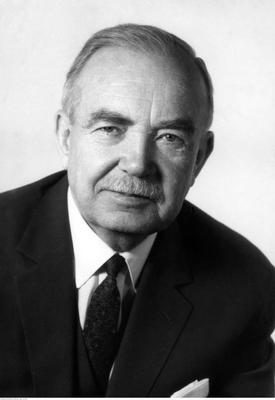

Chairman of the Presidium of Białystok Voivodeship National Council
- In office 14 April 1950 – 13 April 1952
- Preceded by: Witold Wenclik
- Succeeded by: Mieczysław Moczar

Voivode of Białystok Voivodeship
- In office 17 November 1948 – 13 April 1950
- Preceded by: Stanisław Krupka
- Succeeded by: Position abolished

Personal details
- Born: 17 August 1907 Garwolin, Poland
- Died: 28 September 1969 (aged 62) Warsaw
- Resting place: Powązki Cemetery
- Party: United People's Party

Julian Horodecki (born August 17, 1907 in Garwolin, died September 27, 1969 in Warsaw) was a Polish local government official and politician of the peasant movement, member of the Sejm of the Polish People's Republic in the 1st, 2nd, 3rd, 4th, and 5th terms, and Secretary of the State Council from 1957 to 1969.

== Biography ==
He came from a peasant family and was educated at the Free Polish University (studying municipal administration in 1932). From 1935, he was a member of the People's Party, and from 1949 of the United People's Party . He was a member of the party leadership – in 1949 a member of the SL Supreme Council, from 1949 to 1956 a member of the United People's Party Supreme Council, from 1954 a member of the United People's Party Supreme Executive Committee, and from 1957 to 1962 a member of the presidium of the United People's Party Supreme Committee.

Before 1939, he worked in local government in the Krzemieniec County; from 1939 to 1943 in Volhynia, and from 1943 in the Kielce Voivodeship. After liberation, he worked in the local government of the Końskie commune, served as starosta in Łask, from 1949 to 1950 as Voivode of Białystok Voivodeship, from 1950 to 1952 as chairman of the presidium of the Provincial National Council in Białystok, and from 1952 to 1957 as chairman of the presidium of the Provincial National Council in Łódź.

From 1957 to 1969 (until June 1969), he served as secretary of the Council of State. From June 1969, he chaired the Sejm Foreign Affairs Committee. He served as a member of parliament in the Sejm of the Polish People's Republic during the 1st, 2nd, 3rd, 4th, and 5th convocations.

He was buried at the Powązki Cemetery (section A2-tuje-11).

== Awards ==
- Order of the Banner of Labour, First Class
- Commander's Cross with Star of the Order of Polonia Restituta (1964)
- Commander's Cross of the Order of Polonia Restituta
- Medal of the 10th Anniversary of People's Poland
- Badge of the 1000th Anniversary of the Polish State (1966)
- Golden Badge of Honour "For Merit to Warsaw" (1965)
- Badge of Honor of the Construction Trade Union (1963)
- National Order of Merit (France, 1967)
