= Gmina Suraż =

Gmina Suraż Suraż Commune
- Gmina
- Coat of arms

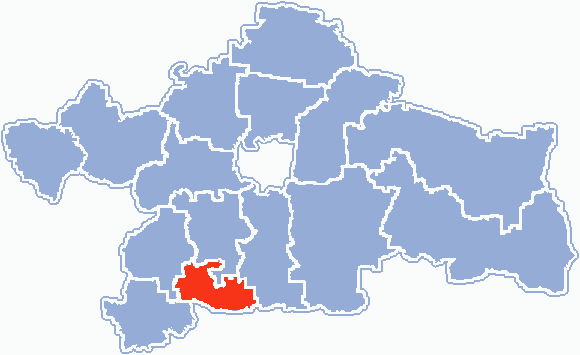
- Location within Białystok County
- Coordinates (Suraż): 52°57′19″N 22°57′19″E
- Country: Poland
- Voivodeship: Podlaskie
- County: Białystok County
- Seat: Suraż

Area
  - Total: 76.6 km^{2} (29.6 sq mi)

Population (2006)
  - Total: 2,038
  - Density: 26.6/km^{2} (68.9/sq mi)
  - Urban: 982
  - Rural: 1,056

Gmina Suraż is an urban-rural gmina (administrative district) in Białystok County, Podlaskie Voivodeship, in north-eastern Poland. Its seat is the town of Suraż, which lies approximately 23 kilometres (14 mi) south-west of the regional capital Białystok.

The gmina covers an area of 76.6 square kilometres (29.6 sq mi), and as of 2006 its total population is 2,038 (out of which the population of Suraż amounts to 982, and the population of the rural part of the gmina is 1,056).

== Villages ==
Apart from the town of Suraż, Gmina Suraż contains the villages and settlements of Doktorce, Końcowizna, Kowale, Lesznia, Ostasze, Ostrów, Rynki, Średzińskie, Zawyki, Zawyki-Ferma, Zimnochy-Susły and Zimnochy-Świechy.

== Neighbouring gminas ==
Gmina Suraż is bordered by the gminas of Juchnowiec Kościelny, Łapy, Poświętne, Turośń Kościelna and Wyszki.
