= Ostasze =

- Village
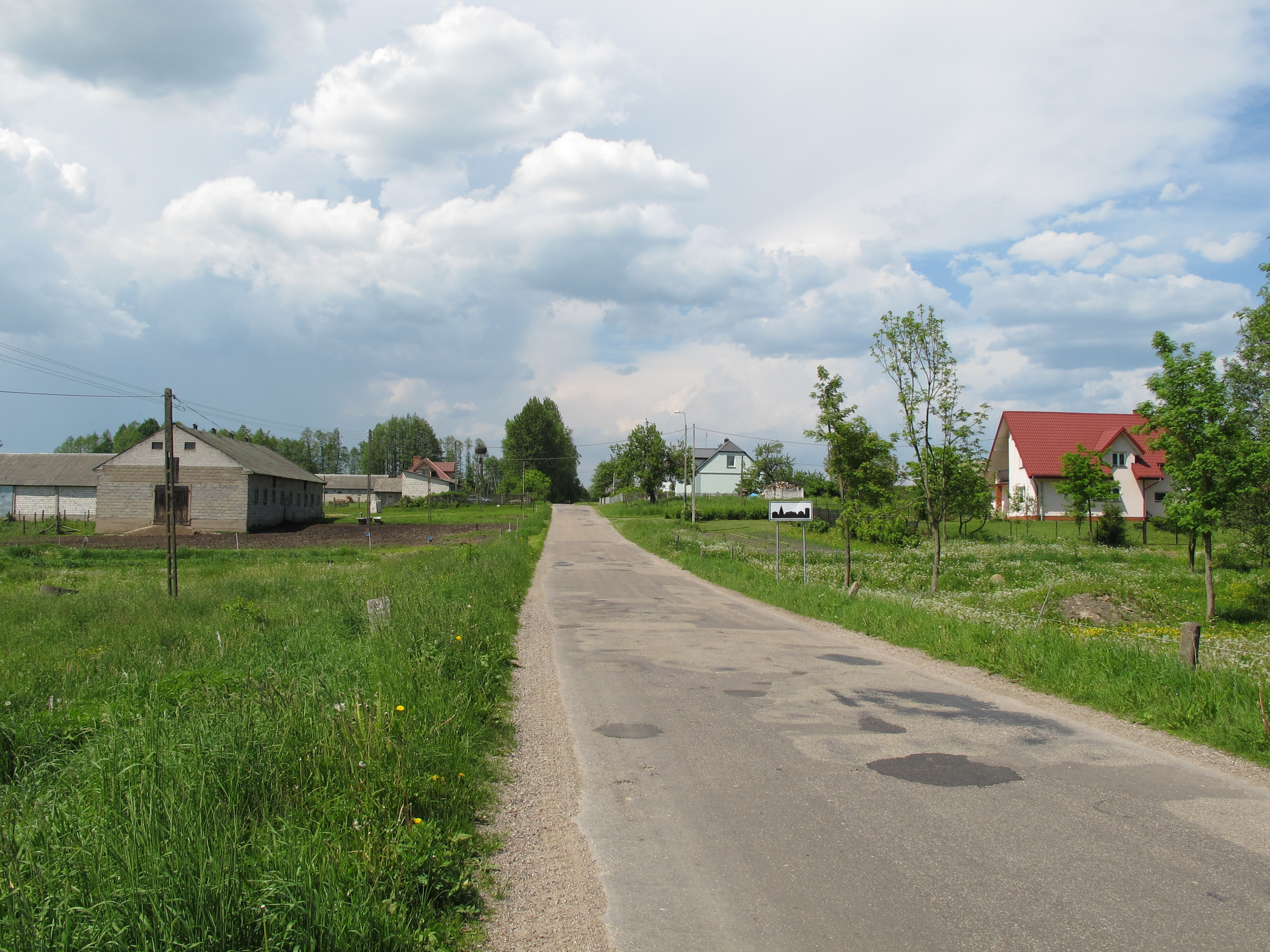

- Location within Poland
- Coordinates: 52°56′1″N 23°4′30″E
- Country: Poland
- Voivodeship: Podlaskie
- County: Białystok
- Gmina: Suraż

Ostasze [ɔsˈtaʂɛ] is a village in the administrative district of Gmina Suraż, within Białystok County, Podlaskie Voivodeship, in north-eastern Poland.
