= Ostrów, Gmina Suraż =

Ostrów
- Village
- Location within Poland
- Coordinates: 52°56′51″N 23°04′00″E
- Country: Poland
- Voivodeship: Podlaskie
- County: Białystok
- Gmina: Suraż

Ostrów [ˈɔstruf] is a village in the administrative district of Gmina Suraż within Białystok County, Podlaskie Voivodeship, in northeastern Poland.
