= Stefan Dybowski =

Polish teacher (1903–1970)

Minister of Culture and Arts of the Polish People's Republic
- In office 6 February 1947 – 20 November 1952
- Preceded by: Władysław Kowalski
- Succeeded by: Włodzimierz Sokorski

Voivode of Białystok Voivodeship
- In office 15 May 1945 – 10 February 1947
- Preceded by: Jerzy Sztachelski
- Succeeded by: Stanisław Krupka

Personal details
- Born: 31 August 1903 Kleczew, Congress Poland
- Died: 30 October 1970 (aged 67) Warsaw, Polish People's Republic
- Resting place: Powązki Military Cemetery
- Awards: Order of Polonia Restituta; Cross of Merit; Order of the Star of the Romanian Socialist Republic; Hungarian Order of Merit

Stefan Dybowski, also known as "Wojciech Bandos" (August 31, 1903- October 30, 1970) was a Polish teacher, peasant movement activist and a politician. He served in various positions including member of the State National Council and the Legislative Sejm (1947–1952); Voivode of Białystok Voivodeship from 1945 to 1947, Minister of Culture and Arts from 1947 to 1952, editor-in-chief and chairman of the board of the People's Publishing Cooperative from 1956 to 1963 and founding member of the Kalisz Society of Friends of Books (1927).

== Biography ==
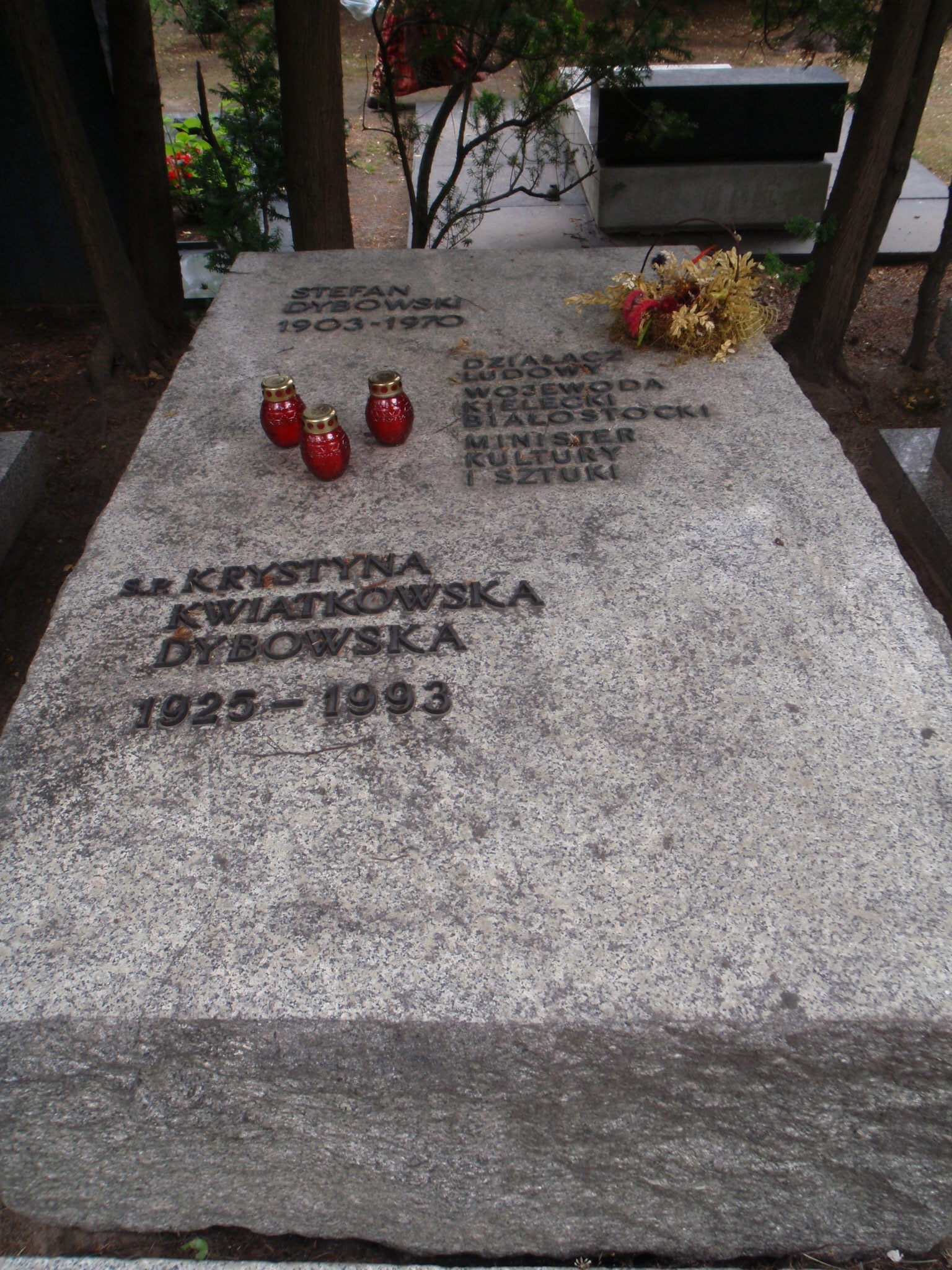
Grave of Dybowski at the Powązki Military Cemetery

Stefan Dybowski was born in Kleczew to Zofia and Teodor Dybowski, who had been under constant police surveillance since the school strike of 1905. Teodor's father had participated in the November Uprising. The Russian authorities forced Teodor Dybowski and his family to leave Zduńska Wola and settle in Piwonice (now a district of Kalisz), where Teodor became a teacher. Stefan Dybowski was the older brother of Janusz Teodor Dybowski, a writer.

In 1920, Stefan Dybowski volunteered to defend Warsaw as a member of the Siberian Brigade. From 1921 to 1932, he served as president of the Kalisz branch of the Riflemen's Association. In Kalisz, he graduated from Tadeusz Kościuszko High School and then began teaching at one of the Kalisz primary schools. In 1923, he was president of the Socialist Youth Circle in Kalisz and joined the Polish Teachers' Union.

In 1927, he became secretary of the newly founded Kalisz Society of Friends of Books. In this association, Dybowski led regional bibliographic work, the aim of which was to compile a complete bibliography of prints published by Kalisz printing houses and literature relating to Kalisz. He then published the work "On the Bibliography of Literature about Kalisz" (1928); the collection of several hundred old prints was destroyed during World War II (1939–1945). In 1937, he graduated from the State Teachers' Institute in Warsaw.

He was a soldier in the Peasant Battalions, an activist of the People's Party "Wola Ludu" (People's Will), the People's Party, and later the United People's Party. He was a member of the Supreme Council of the People's Party (1945–1949), a member of the Supreme Executive Committee of the People's Party (1946–1949), a member of the Supreme Executive Committee of the Union of People's Party (1949–1956), and a deputy member of the Supreme Committee of the Union of People's Party (from December 1956 to March 1969). He was the editor of the regional magazine "Ziemia Kaliska".

From 1944 to 1945, he was deputy voivode of Kielce and a member of the presidium of the Voivodeship National Council in Kielce (its chairman in 1952–1954), and then, until 1947, Voivode of Białystok Voivodeship. From 1947 to 1952, he served as Minister of Culture and Art in the First Cabinet of Józef Cyrankiewicz; during his time in office, he organized, among other things, the Auschwitz-Birkenau State Museum in Oświęcim and the State Museum at Majdanek. He also served as a member of the State National Council and the Legislative Sejm (1947–1952).

From 1954 to 1956, he was an assistant professor and vice-rector of the State Higher Pedagogical School in Warsaw. From 1959 to 1963, he was president of the People's Publishing Cooperative, after which he became a lecturer at the University of Warsaw. From 1959 to 1961, he headed the Polish-Albanian Friendship Society.

He was married to Wanda Nowicka (1905–1978), a teacher. His daughter was Zofia Dybowska-Aleksandrowicz.

He was buried at the Powązki Military Cemetery in Warsaw (section A2-Tuje-5).
