= Białystok Voivodeship (1944–1975) =

Voivodeship of Poland (1945–1975)

Białystok Voivodeship Województwo białostockie
- Voivodeship of Poland
- 1944–1975
- Location of Białystok Voivodeship within the People's Republic of Poland (1950–1975).
- Capital: Białystok
- Area
  - Coordinates: 53°08′N 23°09′E
- History
  - Established: 1944
  - Disestablished: 1975
- Political subdivisions: 24 counties (powiaty)
Preceded by
Belastok Region
Polish Underground State
Succeeded by
Białystok Voivodeship (1975-1998)
Łomża Voivodeship
Suwałki Voivodeship

Białystok Voivodeship (Polish: Województwo białostockie) was an administrative division and local government in Poland from 1944 to 1975, when its purview was separated into eastern Suwałki Voivodeship, Łomża Voivodeship and Białystok Voivodeship (1975–1998). Its capital city was Białystok. The establishment of Podlaskie Voivodeship in 1999 was essentially a reunion of the areas of Białystok Voivodeship (1945–1975).

The area's administrative region of 1950 amounted to 23 201 square kilometers, which was later reduced to 23 153 square kilometers. In 1946 the population approximately 941 000 and in 1970 it had approximately 1 176 000 inhabitants.

== Politics ==
From 1945 to 1950 served as Voivodes Jerzy Sztachelski, Stefan Dybowski, Stanisław Krupka and Julian Horodecki.

=== Formation of the Voivodeship party structure ===
Creation of its structures began only after July 27, 1944, when the Soviet Armed Forces entered Bialystok. In August this year the PPR Provincial Committee was created. It should be added that none of the members of this committee she was not formally a member of this party. First members in the Bialystok Voivodeship they were not admitted to the Polish Workers' Party until August 21, 1944, during a meeting of the Provincial Committee. Following the unification of the PPS and PPR, The Polish United Workers' Party in the Białystok Voivodeship included about 16 thousand former PPR members and 3.5 thousand members of the former PPS. Secretaries 73% newly created basic party organizations were members of the former Polish Workers' Party, while members of the aforementioned party organizations were appointed deputy secretaries PPS.

On December 23, 1948, during the meeting of the provincial committees of the former PPR and PPS, the Provincial Committee and the executive committee of the Polish United Workers' Party in Bialystok were elected. Mieczysław Tureniec from the PPR was elected the first secretary of the Polish United Workers' Party and Stefan Dąbek from the former PPS as Second Secretary.

In 1944 to 1956, the function of the first secretary of the Polish United Workers' Party Voivodeship Committee in Bialystok was held by the following people: Edwarda Orłowska (1944–1945), Mieczysław Bodalski (1945–1947), Mieczysław Tureniec, Józef Faruga, Józef Rygliszyn, Grzegorz Wojciechowski, Stanisław Brodziński and Jan Jabłoński. On the wave of October 1956 transformations, for a period of less than three weeks Antoni Laskowski was the secretary. Arkadiusz Łaszewicz took this position in November 1956 following the political overhaul which followed the Polish October.

=== Voivodeship National Council ===
At the state apparatus level, Bialystok Voivodeship National Council (the Voivodeship regional parliament) was created The first, inaugural meeting of the Voivodeship National Council in 57a Warszawska Street in Bialystok was held on August 28, 1944, with 23 members. dr Jerzy Sztachelski, was elected as the chairman, the vice-chairmen in the persons of Jakub Antoniuk and Władysław Nieśmiałek and the secretary general - Tadeusz Jackowski. The creation of WRN in Bialystok took place on the basis of the Provisional Statute of the National Councils. Due to Sztachelski's appointment as Voivode, at the meeting of the Voivodeship National Council on October 21, 1944, Jan Kuśniarek was appointed to replace him as the head of that body with Jakub Antoniuk as deputy and Bolesław Sokół and Eugenia Krassowska as members of the presidium. In February 1945 Tadeusz Jackowski became the head with Bolesław Podedworny as his deputy and Edward Orłowska, Bolesław Sokół and Eugenia Krassowska as members of the presidium. It was later led by Julian Horodecki (14.04.1950–13.04.1952), Mieczysław Moczar (22.04.1952–15.12.1954), Józef Szczęśniak (15.04.1954–01.12.1956), Stanisław Juchnicki (01.12.1956–07.02.1958), Jerzy Popko (07.12.1958–21.11.1962), Stefan Żmijko (21.11.1962–04.03.1972 and Zygmunt Sprycha (04.03.1972–12.12.1973).

=== Leadership ===
Secretaries of the Voivodeship Committee of the Polish United Workers' Party:

Name	Term
Mieczysław Tureniec	1948 - September 1949
Józef Faruga	1949–1950
Józef Rygliszyn	1.10.1950 - 18.5.1951
Grzegorz Wojciechowski	18.4.1951 - 6.12.1952
Stanisław Brodziński	6.12.1952 - 6.9.1955
Jan Jabłoński	1955–1956
Antoni Laskowski	1956–1971
Arkadiusz Łaszewicz	1956–1971
Zdzisław Kurowski	January 1972 - May 1975

Voivodes:

Name	Term
Jerzy Sztachelski	09.1944–04.1945
Stefan Dybowski	15.05.1945–10.02.1947
Stanisław Krupka	10.02.1947–31.08.1948
Julian Horodecki	17.11.1948–13.04.1950

Chairmen of the Voivodeship National Council Presidium (Polish: Przewodniczący Prezydium WRN w Białymstoku)

Name	Term
Jerzy Sztachelski	28.08.1944- 21.10.1944
Jan Kuśmierek	21.10.1944-20.1.1945
Tadeusz Jackowski	20.1.1945 - 18.5.1945
Witold Wenclik	18.5.1945 - 26.5.1950
Julian Horodecki	14.04.1950–13.04.1952
Mieczysław Moczar	22.04.1952–15.12.1954
Józef Szczęśniak	15.04.1954–01.12.1956
Stanisław Juchnicki	01.12.1956–07.02.1958
Jerzy Popko	07.12.1958–21.11.1962
Stefan Żmijko	21.11.1962–04.03.1972
Zygmunt Sprycha	04.03.1972 - 12.12.1973
Zdzisław Kurowski	1974

== History ==
In early 1944, when the Red Army crossed the Polish frontier before the war, the Bialystok Voivodeship was divided administratively by the German-occupied areas incorporated into the Third Reich (Bezirk Bialystok) and the occupied territories of the USSR (Reich Commissariat East).

Over the next months, the front moved into the pre-war Polish territory. However, according to the findings of the Tehran Conference of 1943, it was known that the pre-war Polish eastern territories would be incorporated into the Soviet Union and eastern territories of Germany would be incorporated into Polish (more precisely define these territorial changes occurred during the Yalta Conference and the Potsdam Conference). For this reason, the Polish territories occupied by the Red Army in early 1944 did not create the Polish administration. Only after crossing the line in July 1944 the Bug, which would be the future eastern border of Poland, Polish authorities were established in the form of the Polish Committee of National Liberation.

A month after the start of its operations, PCNL issued the Decree of the Polish Committee of National Liberation of August 21, 1944 on the Procedure for the appointment of general administration authorities and second instance, which came into force on 22 August 1944. In this decree (Article 11), it abolished the administrative structure introduced by Germany and restored the Bialystok Voivodeship administrative divisions from the Second Polish Republic. At the time, the front line ran in front of the Vistula and Narew, and the formal authority PKWN had was only in part of the pre-war Białystok Voivodeship.

Parallel to the occurring process of changing the rule from Nazi to Soviet, the regional branches of the underground organisations continued to be active. On August 7, 1944, voivode Józef Przybyszewski was arrested and deported to the east. The arrest of the voivode, the instigator of the merger talks between National Military Organization and National Armed Forces, did not interrupt the integration process of the two national organizations. The talks were finalized after Przybyszewski's arrest and in August a joint District Command for NOW and NSZ was established - NOW XIII-C. The District Commander was Mieczysław Grygorcewicz ("Bohdan"), who was arrested shortly after by the NKVD in early September. The functions of the District Commander of NOW-NSZ XIII/C were assumed on September 22 by Roman Jastrzebski. At the same time, two orders of the District Command "Cyryl" were issued, no. 1918 and 1919. The first, allegedly signed by Mieczysław Grygorcewicz ("Morski"), informed that until "Morski" returned, the functions of the District Commander were to be held by "Lot". Krzysztof Komorowski suspects that the author of both was Władysław Szwarc. On September 11, the members of the NOW District Staff held a meeting and elected Władysław Szawrzec as the acting district commander. At the end of October, Mieczysław Grygorcewicz was released and on November 1, he again assumed the function of the District commander.

29 September 1944, administration of 17 (of the 23) districts of Belastok Region (including the city of Białystok) and an additional three (Siemiatycze, Hajnówka and Kleszczele) of the Brest Region was passed to the Polish Committee of National Liberation from the Byelorussian SSR.

31 December 1944 the Provisional Government of the Republic of Poland replaced the Polish Committee of National Liberation.

14 March 1945 the Provisional Government of the Republic of Poland made the initial administrative division of the German lands included in the Polish (so-called Recovered Territories ), even before taking all of these areas, creating them four administrative districts do not have the status of regions: Region I (Opole Silesia), District II (Lower Silesia), District III (West Pomerania), District IV (Mazury).

The Border Agreement between Poland and the USSR of 16 August 1945 established the borders between the Union of Soviet Socialist Republics (USSR) and the Republic of Poland. It was signed by the Provisional Government of National Unity (Polish: Tymczasowy Rząd Jedności Narodowej).

August 18, 1945 transferred Łomża County from the Warsaw Voivodeship to the Białystok Voivodeship.

September 25, 1945 part of the counties of the Recovered Territories transmitted under the management of the Białystok Voivodeship (Gołdap, Ełk and Olecko) from District IV (Mazury). These districts have provisionally become parts of the Voivodeship, although de jure continue to form part of Recovered Territories (MP, 1945 No. 29, item. 77). On June 28, 1946, the areas of the Recovered Territories assigned to Białystok Voivodeship were formally transferred.

Some cities lost civic rights without joining larger neighboring cities: Dąbrowa Białostocka*, Kleszczele*, Krynki, Sokoły, Suchowola*, Tykocin* (1950)

1 July 1952 created Siemiatycze County.

1954 the following Counties were created: hajnowski, łapy, moniecki, zambrow

Between 1954 and 1972, gromadas formed the lowest tier of local government in the voivodeship, taking over the role previously played by gminy. A gromada would generally consist of several villages, but they were smaller units than the gminy had been. In 1973 gminy were reintroduced and gromadas abolished.

1956 the following counties were created: dąbrowski (białostocki), sejneński

== Administrative divisions ==
=== Województwo białostockie (1946) ===
Powiat	Pow.(km^{2})	Ludność	Mieszk. /km^{2}	Miasta	Gminy	Siedziba
Województwo białostockie
Augustowski	1641	42 178	26	1	7	Augustów
Białostocki	3350	137 250	41	8	15	Białystok
Bielski	4628	198 470	43	6	17	Bielsk Podlaski
Ełcki	1115	21 595	19	1	12	Ełk
Gołdapski	613	2 592	4	1	4	Gołdap
Łomżyński	2657	140 657	53	6	19	Łomża
Olecki	856	12 282	14	1	6	Olecko
Sokólski	2531	89 939	36	1	12	Sokółka
Suwalski	2204	79 354	36	2	16	Suwałki
Szczuczyński	1451	55 910	39	3	10	Grajewo
Wysokomazowiecki	1467	80 577	55	4	10	Wysokie Mazowieckie
m. Białystok	39	56 759	1456	1	0	Białystok

=== Województwo białostockie ===
Powiat	Siedziba powiatu	Liczba miast	Liczba gmin	Liczba gromad	Miasta (wytłuszczone) i gminy (z liczbą gromad w nawiasach)
Województwo białostockie – 1 VII 1952 r.
Augustowski	Augustów	1	7	172	miasto Augustów • Bargłów (22) • Dębowo (10) • Dowspuda (25) • Kolnica (17) • Lipsk (39) • Szczebro-Olszanka (31) • Sztabin (28)
Białostocki	Białystok	8	15	432	miasto Choroszcz • miasto Goniądz • miasto Knyszyn • miasto Starosielce • miasto Supraśl • miasto Suraż • miasto Wasilków • miasto Zabłudów • Bacieczki (21) • Barszczewo (32) • Czarna Wieś (18) • Dojlidy (16) • Goniądz (27) • Gródek (35) • Jaświły (28) • Juchnowiec (28) • Kalinówka (37) • Krypno (26) • Michałowo (33) • Obrubniki (26) • Trzcianne (28) • Zabłudów (45) • Zawyki (32)
Białystok miasto	Białystok	1	0	0	miasto Białystok
Bielski	Bielsk Podlaski	3	27	321	miasto Bielsk Podlaski • miasto Brańsk • miasto Hajnówka • Augustowo (10) • Białowieża (4) • Boćki (15) • Brańsk (14) • Chraboły (10) • Czeremcha (9) • Czyże (11) • Dobromil (10) • Domanowo (10) • Dubicze Cerkiewne (11) • Hajnówka (17) • Holonki (15) • Klejniki (10) • Kleszczele (11) • Łosinka (15) • Łubin Kościelny (11) • Narew (16) • Narewka (19) • Orla (15) • Pasynki (10) • Policzna (9) • Rudka (7) • Ryboły (8) • Śnieżki (13) • Topczewo (17) • Widowo (6) • Wyszki (18)
Ełcki	Ełk	1	12	153	miasto Ełk • Bajtkowo (11) • Ełk (11) • Golubie (13) • Kalinowo (18) • Klusy (9) • Nowa Wieś Ełcka (10) • Pisanica (15) • Prostki (16) • Stare Juchy (18) • Straduny (9) • Wiśniowo Ełckie (14) • Woszczele (9)
Gołdapski	Gołdap	1	4	50	miasto Gołdap • Dubeninki (15) • Górne (7) • Grabowo (17) • Jabłońskie (11)
Grajewski	Grajewo	3	8	167	miasto Grajewo • miasto Rajgród • miasto Szczuczyn • Bełda (26) • Białaszewo (23) • Bogusze (27) • Pruska (15) • Radziłów (19) • Ruda (10) • Szczuczyn (35) • Wąsosz (12)
Kolneński	Kolno	2	8	177	miasto Kolno • miasto Stawiski • Czerwone (21) • Gawrychy (20) • Grabowo (27) • Lachowo (23) • Łyse (17) • Mały Płock (20) • Stawiski (29) • Turośl (20)
Łomżyński	Łomża	4	16	463	miasto Jedwabne • miasto Łomża • miasto Nowogród • miasto Zambrów • Bożejewo (25) • Chlebiotki (26) • Długobórz (46) • Drozdowo (29) • Jedwabne (36) • Kołaki (25) • Kupiski (19) • Lubotyń (23) • Miastkowo (24) • Przytuły (41) • Puchały (29) • Rogienice (25) • Rutki (36) • Szczepankowo (32) • Szumowo (18) • Śniadowo (29)
Olecki	Olecko	1	6	91	miasto Olecko • Borawskie (16) • Mieruniszki (10) • Sokółki (17) • Świętajno (15) • Wieliczki (20) • Zalesie (13)
Siemiatycki (od 1 VII 1952)	Siemiatycze	3	18	222	miasto Ciechanowiec • miasto Drohiczyn • miasto Siemiatycze • Baciki Średnie (9) • Boratyniec Ruski (12) • Czartajew (16) • Dołubowo (10) • Drohiczyn (18) • Dziadkowice (16) • Grodzisk (16) • Klukowicze (14) • Kosiorki (10) • Krupice (10) • Mielnik (7) • Milejczyce (12) • Nurzec (12) • Ostrożany (13) • Perlejewo (13) • Pobikry (13) • Śledzianów (10) • Winna Chroły (11)
Sokólski	Sokółka	1	12	360	miasto Sokółka • Babiki (18) • Dąbrowa (45) • Janów (32) • Korycin (43) • Krynki (19) • Kuźnica (21) • Nowy Dwór (15) • Sidra (21) • Sokółka (51) • Suchowola (47) • Szudziałowo (35) • Zalesie (13)
Suwalski	Suwałki	2	16	441	miasto Sejny • miasto Suwałki • Berżniki (26) • Filipów (22) • Giby (33) • Huta (26) • Jeleniewo (30) • Kadaryszki (35) • Koniecbór (15) • Krasnopol (31) • Krasnowo (22) • Kuków (36) • Pawłówka (21) • Przerośl (17) • Puńsk (33) • Szypliszki (41) • Wiżajny (27) • Wólka (26)
Wysokomazowiecki	Wysokie Mazowieckie	2	10	412	miasto Łapy • miasto Wysokie Mazowieckie • Czyżew (36) • Klukowo (43) • Kobylin (41) • Kowalewszczyzna (21) • Piekuty (42) • Poświętne (44) • Sokoły (45) • Szepietowo (64) • Tykocin (22) • Wysokie Mazowieckie (54)

List of Counties in 1967:

- City Counties: Białystok. (1)
- Land Counties: Augustów, Białystok, Bielsk Podlaski, Dąbrowa Białostocka, Ełk, Gołdap, Grajewo, Hajnówka, Kolno, Łapy, Łomża, Mońki, Olecko, Sejny, Siemiatycze, Sokółka, Suwałki, Wysokie Mazowieckie, Zambrów. (19)

=== Adjacent voivodeships ===
The Voivodeship shares a border on the east with the Olsztyn Voivodeship, the southwest with the Warsaw Voivodeship, the south with the Lublin Voivodeship, the north with the RSFSR's Kaliningrad Oblast, the northeast with the Lithuanian SSR and the east with the Byelorussian SSR.

== See also ==
- Białystok Voivodeship (1919–1939)
- Białystok Voivodeship (1975–1998)
