= Zawyki-Ferma =

- Village
- Location within Poland
- Coordinates: 52°55′20″N 22°59′39″E
- Country: Poland
- Voivodeship: Podlaskie
- County: Białystok
- Gmina: Suraż

Zawyki-Ferma [zaˈvɨki ˈfɛrma] is a village in the administrative district of Gmina Suraż, within Białystok County, Podlaskie Voivodeship, in north-eastern Poland.
