= Kowale, Białystok County =

Kowale
- Village
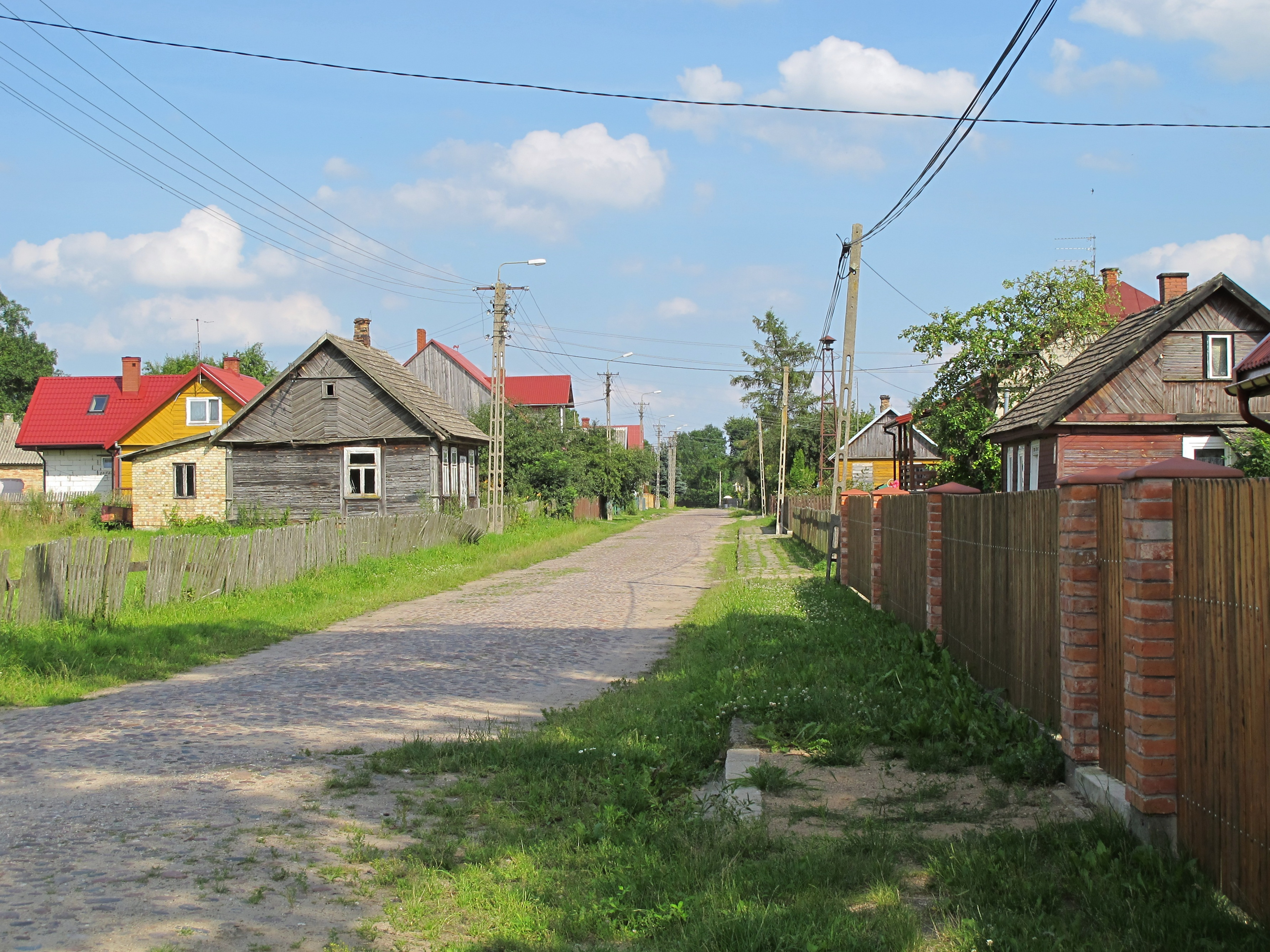

- Location within Poland
- Coordinates: 52°58′44″N 22°59′45″E
- Country: Poland
- Voivodeship: Podlaskie
- County: Białystok
- Gmina: Suraż
- Time zone: UTC+1 (CET)
  - Summer (DST): UTC+2 (CEST)
- Postal code: 18-105
- Vehicle registration: BIA

Kowale ([kɔˈvalɛ]) is a village in the administrative district of Gmina Suraż, within Białystok County, Podlaskie Voivodeship, in north-eastern Poland.

According to the 1921 census, the village had a population of 147, entirely Polish by nationality and Roman Catholic by confession.
