= Zimnochy-Świechy =

- Village
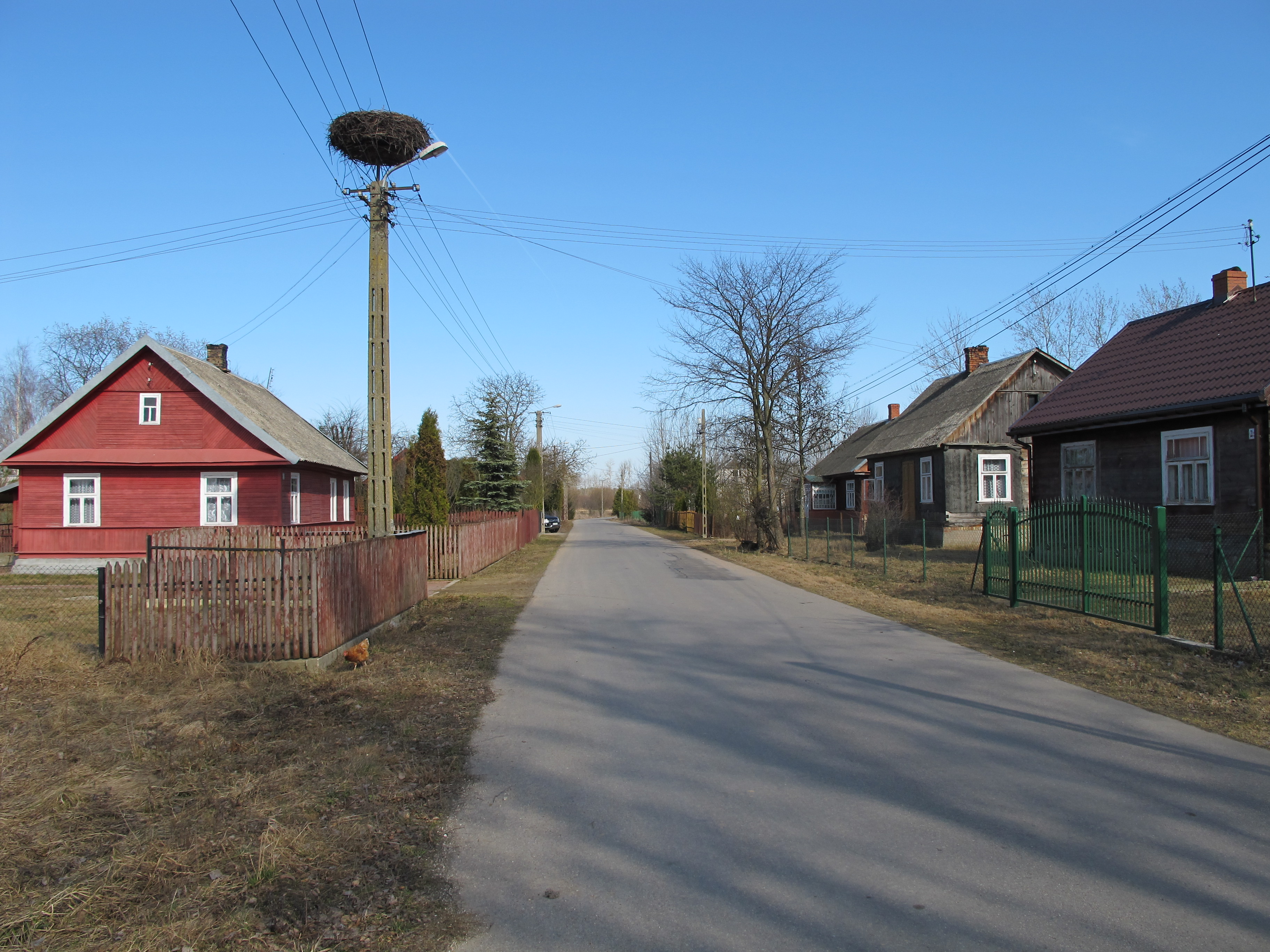

- Location within Poland
- Coordinates: 52°56′41″N 23°4′31″E
- Country: Poland
- Voivodeship: Podlaskie
- County: Białystok
- Gmina: Suraż

Zimnochy-Świechy (Polish pronunciation: [ʑimˈnɔxɨ ˈɕfjɛxɨ]) is a village in the administrative district of Gmina Suraż, within Białystok County, Podlaskie Voivodeship, in north-eastern Poland.

According to the 1921 census, the village was inhabited by 107 people, among whom 102 were Roman Catholic and 5 Mosaic. At the same time, 129 inhabitants declared Polish nationality, 5 Jewish. There were 17 residential buildings in the village.
