= Lesznia =

- Village
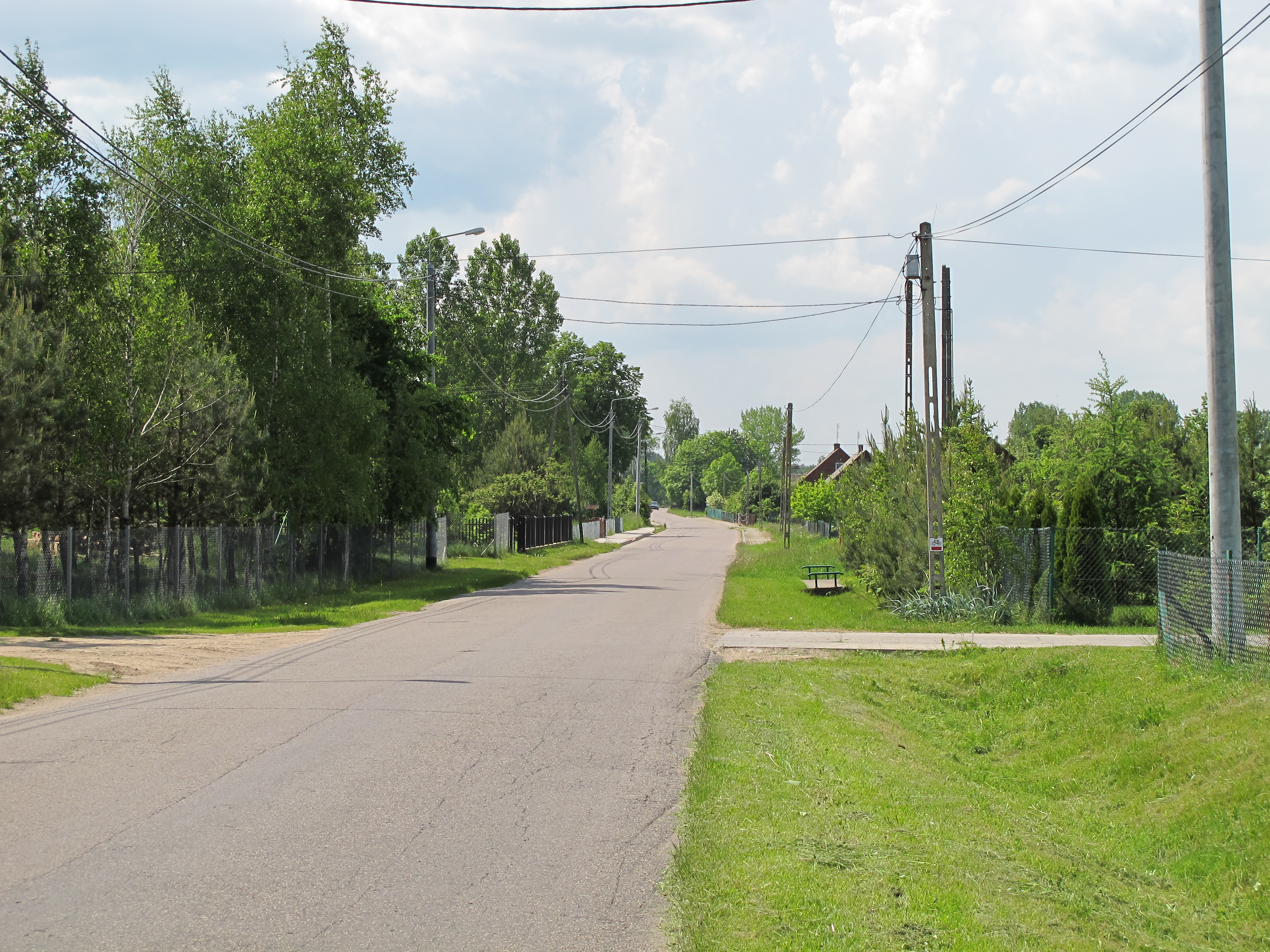

- Location within Poland
- Coordinates: 52°55′3″N 23°5′41″E
- Country: Poland
- Voivodeship: Podlaskie
- County: Białystok
- Gmina: Suraż

Lesznia [ˈlɛʂɲa] is a village in the administrative district of Gmina Suraż, within Białystok County, Podlaskie Voivodeship, in north-eastern Poland.
