= Návsí =

Návsí Nawsie
- Municipality
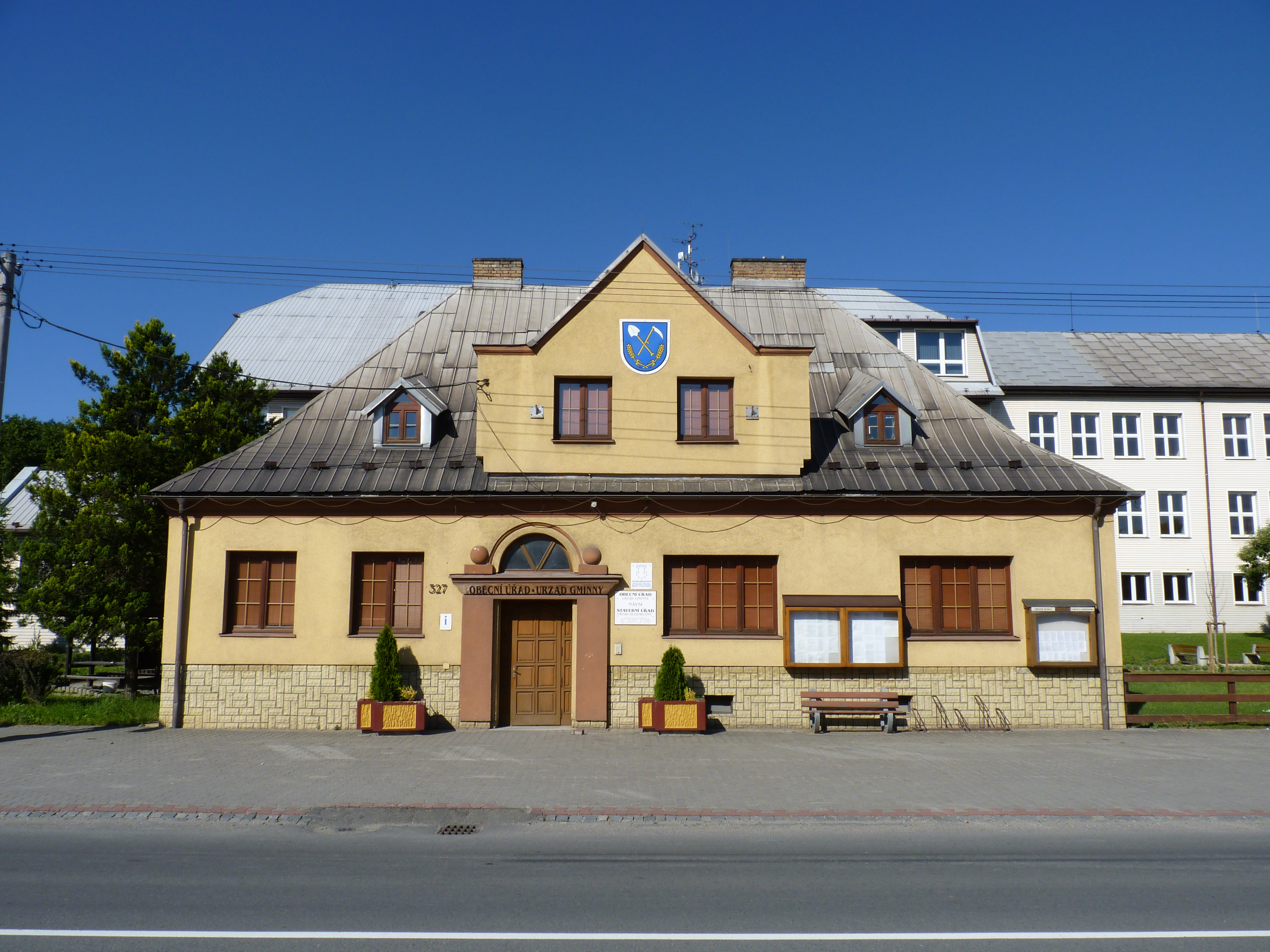
- Municipal office

- Flag Coat of arms

- Location in the Czech Republic
- Coordinates: 49°35′14″N 18°45′33″E
- Country: Czech Republic
- Region: Moravian-Silesian
- District: Frýdek-Místek
- First mentioned: 1435

Area
  - Total: 19.64 km^{2} (7.58 sq mi)
- Elevation: 386 m (1,266 ft)

Population (2026-01-01)
  - Total: 3,906
  - Density: 198.9/km^{2} (515.1/sq mi)
- Time zone: UTC+1 (CET)
  - Summer (DST): UTC+2 (CEST)
- Postal code: 739 92
- Website: www.navsi.cz

Návsí (Czech pronunciation: [ˈnaːfsiː]; Polish: Nawsie, German: Nawsi) is a municipality and village in Frýdek-Místek District in the Moravian-Silesian Region of the Czech Republic. It has about 3,900 inhabitants. The municipality is located on the Olza River at the border with Poland and has a significant Polish minority.

== Etymology ==
The name is derived from náves and nawsie, which denotes an empty part of a village customarily used as a common pasture. It served as a common of neighbouring Jablunkov.

== Geography ==
Návsí is located about 30 kilometres (19 mi) southeast of Frýdek-Místek and 41 km (25 mi) southeast of Ostrava. It lies in the historical region of Cieszyn Silesia and a small part of the municipality borders Poland. It lies on both banks of the Olza River.

The municipality is located mainly in the Jablunkov Furrow lowland, but it also extends to the Silesian Beskids in the east, and to the Moravian-Silesian Beskids and the Beskydy Protected Landscape Area in the west. The highest points are the mountains Velký Stožek at 978 m (3,209 ft) and Krkavice at 976 m (3,202 ft) above sea level, both located on the Czech–Polish border. In the northern part of the municipality is situated the mountain meadow of Filipka and the Rohovec forest, both protected as nature monuments.

== History ==
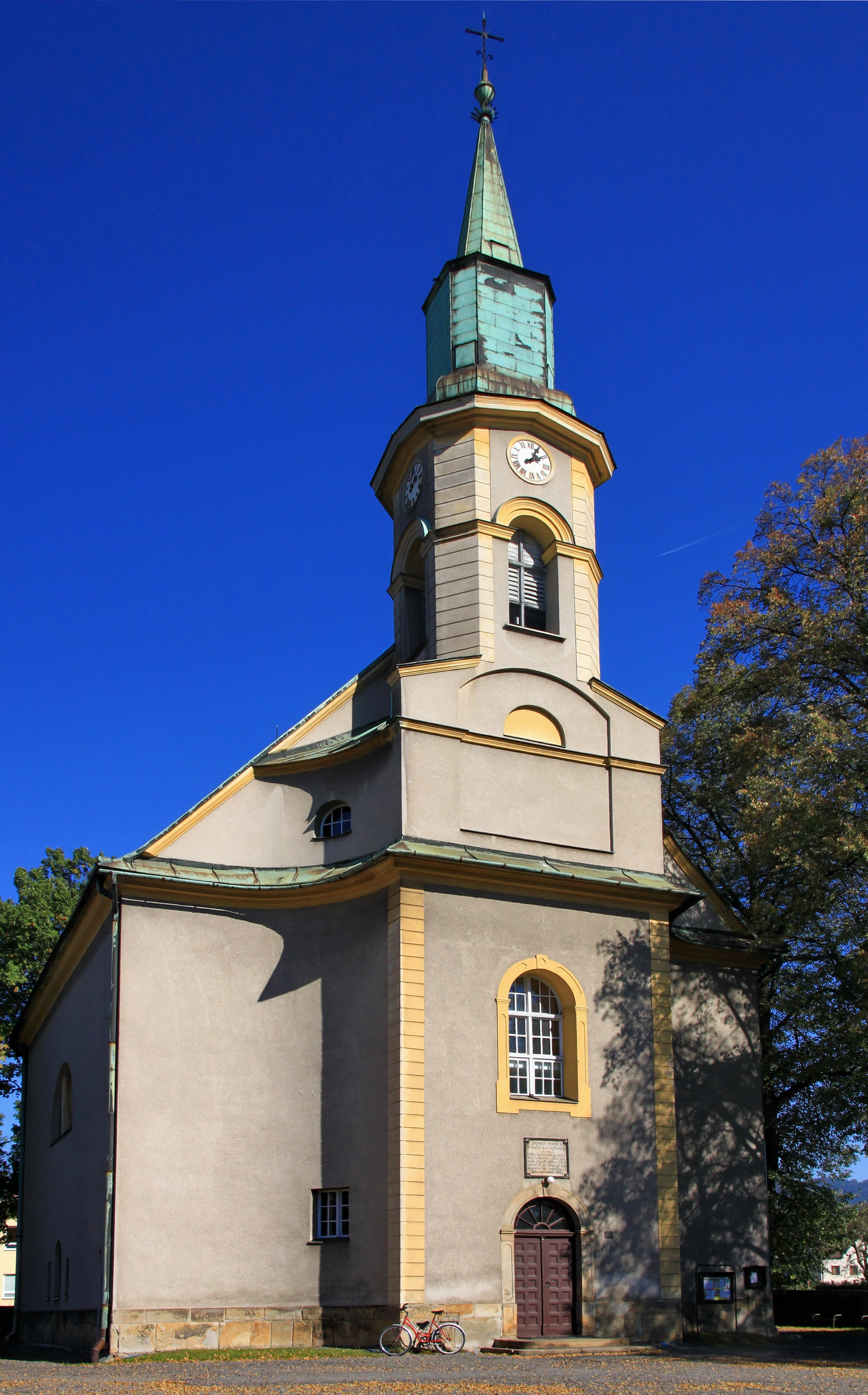
Lutheran church

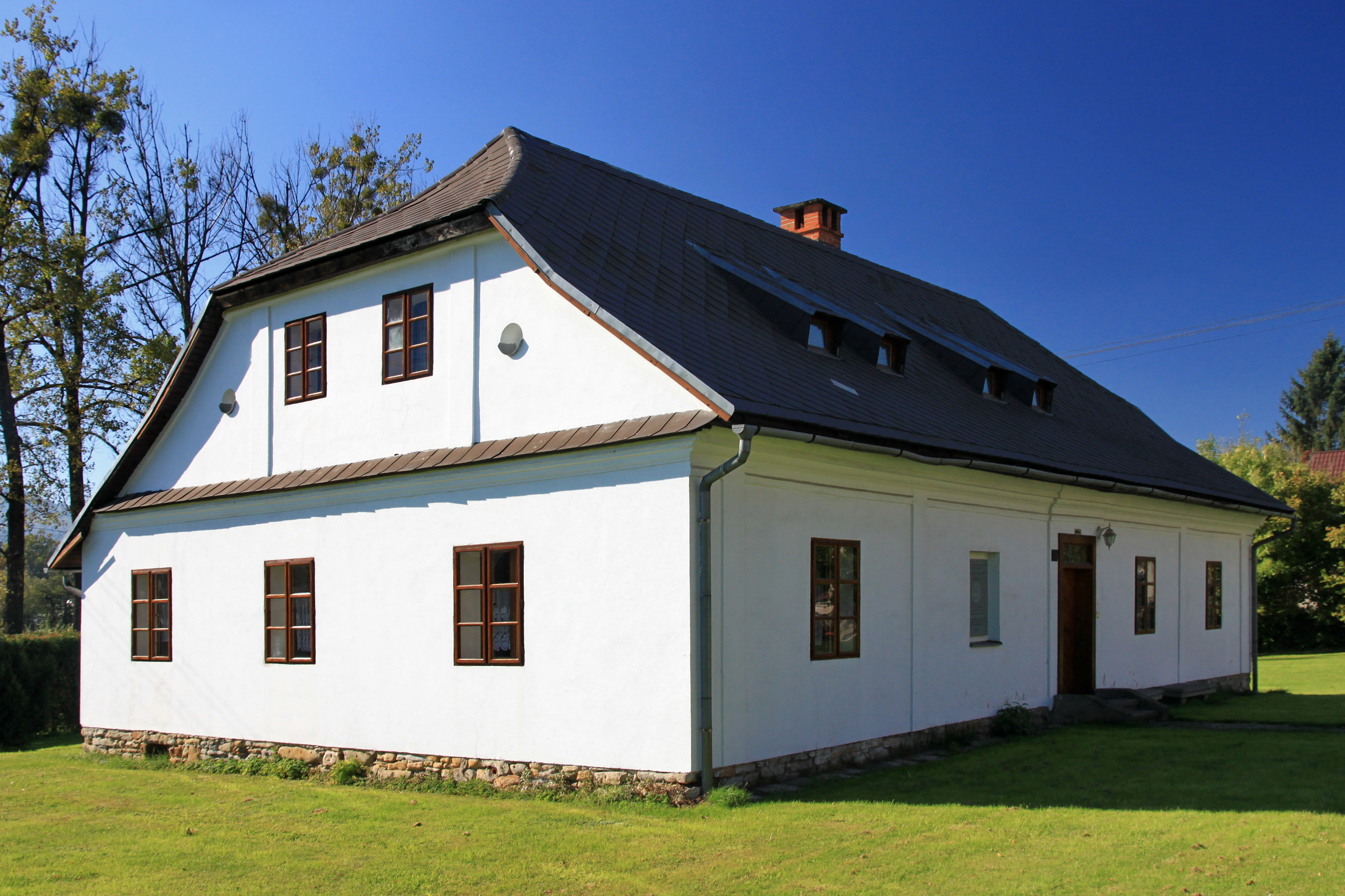
Former Evangelical school

It is possible that the village was already mentioned in a document of Bishop of Wrocław issued on 23 May 1223 for Norbertine Sisters in Rybnik among villages paying them a tithe as Novoza, however without certainty.

The first verified written mention of Návsí is from 1435, when Duke Wenceslaus I of Cieszyn gave a privilege to Paweł Sikora to establish a farming community. Návsí was originally called Jablunkov, but after the village was destroyed by a Hungarian raid, a new settlement emerged nearby (today's Jablunkov) and Návsí became known as Old Jablunkov. Návsí was first mentioned under its modern name in 1577 as Nawsy.

In addition to not very profitable agriculture, the inhabitants devoted themselves to mountain farming, which developed in the 16th and 17th centuries. In the 18th century, the use of forests led to the decline of mountain farming.

The Sikora family was very rich in regional conditions and gradually owned a mill and a mile here and gained abandoned lands. In 1791 they had built a wooden Protestant church, the bricked one was built in 1817–1820. In 1793, a rectory was built, and the Evangelical school was established in 1794. The Sikora family managed the village until the early 20th century.

After Revolutions of 1848 in the Austrian Empire a modern municipal division was introduced in the re-established Austrian Silesia. The village as a municipality was subscribed to the political district of Teschen and the legal district of Jablunkau. The municipality developed quickly the Košice–Bohumín Railway line was put into operation in 1871. Thanks to the railway, the importance of Návsí increased. A new village centre was formed near the railway station.

According to the censuses conducted in 1880–1910, the population of the municipality grew from 1,412 in 1880 to 2,249 in 1910 with a majority being native Polish-speakers (between 94.7% and 97.7%) accompanied by German-speaking (at most 74 or 4% in 1900) and Czech-speaking people (at most 17 or 0.9% in 1900). In terms of religion in 1910 the majority were Protestants (1,449 or 64.4%), followed by Roman Catholics (783 or 34.8%) and Jews (17 or 0.8%).

After World War I, Polish–Czechoslovak War and the division of Cieszyn Silesia in 1920, it became a part of Czechoslovakia. Following the Munich Agreement, in October 1938 together with the Trans-Olza region it was annexed by Poland, administratively adjoined to Cieszyn County of Silesian Voivodeship. Návsí was then annexed by Nazi Germany at the beginning of World War II. After the war, it was restored to Czechoslovakia.

From 1960 to 1993, Návsí was a municipal part of Jablunkov.

== Demographics ==
According to the 2021 Census, Polish minority makes up 17.4% of the population.

Historical population

Year	Pop.	±%
1869	1,057	—
1880	1,412	+33.6%
1890	1,629	+15.4%
1900	1,917	+17.7%
1910	2,249	+17.3%

Year	Pop.	±%
1921	2,503	+11.3%
1930	3,102	+23.9%
1950	3,306	+6.6%
1961	3,588	+8.5%
1970	3,609	+0.6%

Year	Pop.	±%
1980	3,588	−0.6%
1991	3,623	+1.0%
2001	3,765	+3.9%
2011	3,743	−0.6%
2021	3,733	−0.3%

Source: Censuses

== Transport ==
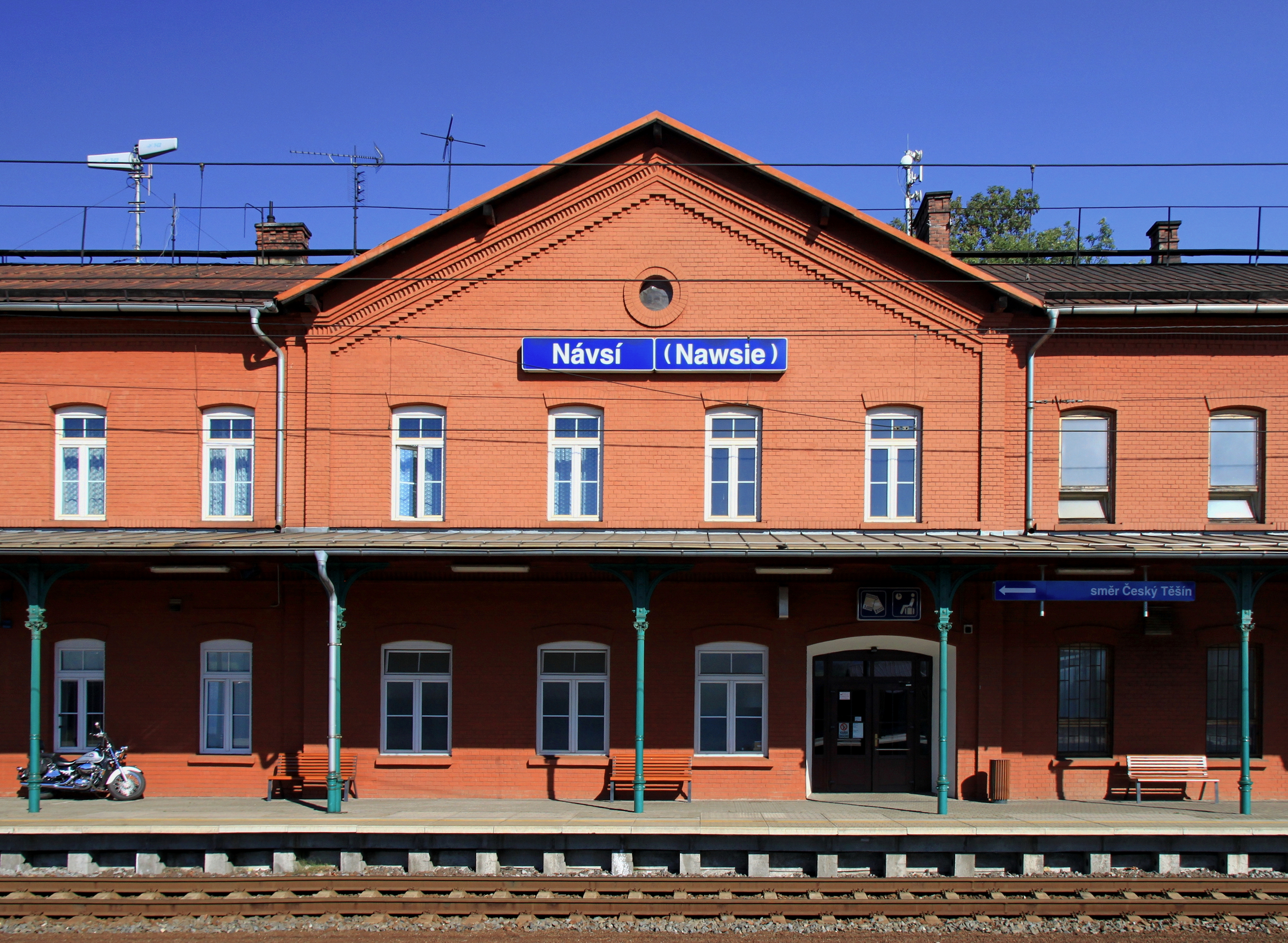
Train station

Návsí is located on the railway lines Prague–Žilina and Ostrava–Mosty u Jablunkova.

== Sights ==
The most valuable building is the Lutheran church. It was built in 1817–1820 and the tower was added in 1849.

== Notable people ==
- Władysław Michejda (1876–1937), Polish lawyer and mayor of Cieszyn
- Tadeusz Michejda (1879–1956), Polish medical doctor and politician
- Władysław Młynek (1930–1997), Polish-Czech poet and writer; lived and died here
- Halina Mlynkova (born 1977), Polish-Czech singer
- Krystyna Pyszková (born 1999), Czech model and beauty pageant titleholder
- Adam Gawlas (born 2002), Czech darts player
