= Średzińskie =

- Village
- Location within Poland
- Coordinates: 52°57′N 23°2′E
- Country: Poland
- Voivodeship: Podlaskie
- County: Białystok
- Gmina: Suraż

Średzińskie [ɕrɛˈd͡ʑiɲskʲɛ] is a village in the administrative district of Gmina Suraż, within Białystok County, Podlaskie Voivodeship, in north-eastern Poland.
