= Zimnochy-Susły =

- Village
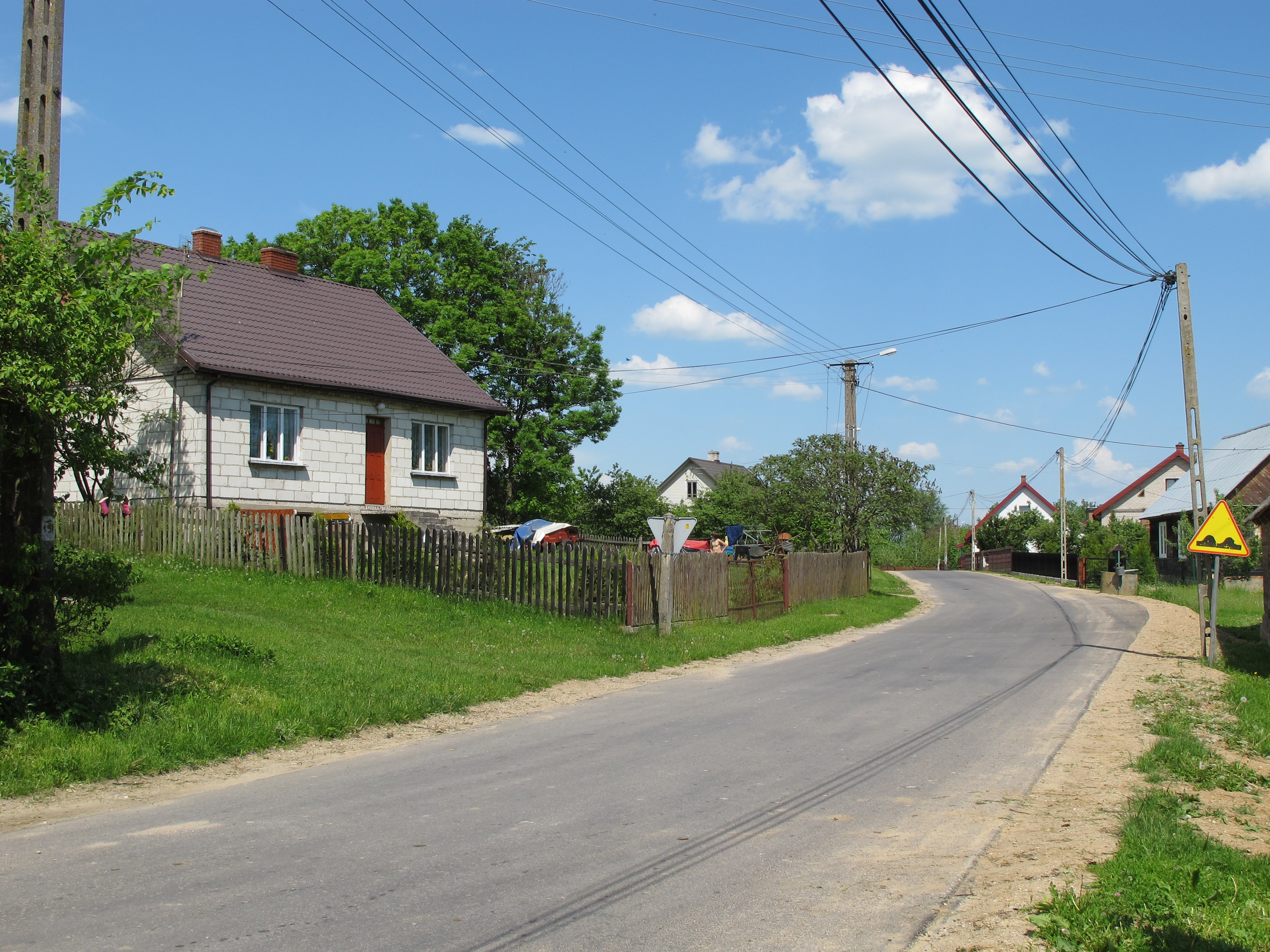

- Location within Poland
- Coordinates: 52°56′35″N 23°4′12″E
- Country: Poland
- Voivodeship: Podlaskie
- County: Białystok
- Gmina: Suraż

Zimnochy-Susły [ʑimˈnɔxɨ ˈsuswɨ] is a village in the administrative district of Gmina Suraż, within Białystok County, Podlaskie Voivodeship, in north-eastern Poland.
