= Jerzy Sztachelski =

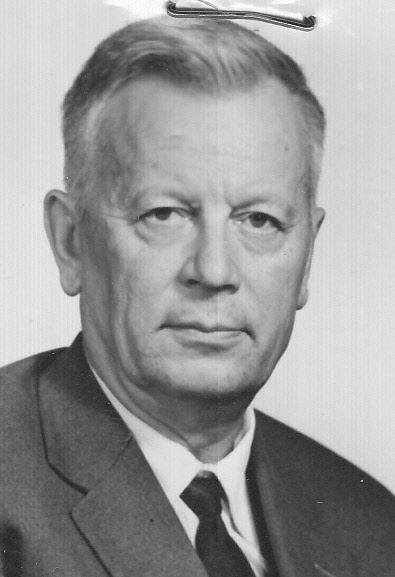

Minister of Health of the Polish People's Republic
- In office 10 January 1951 – 13 November 1956
- Preceded by: Tadeusz Michejda
- Succeeded by: Rajmund Barański
- In office 18 May 1961 – 15 July 1968
- Preceded by: Rajmund Barański
- Succeeded by: Jan Karol Kostrzewski

Voivode of Białystok Voivodeship
- In office August 1944 – April 1945
- Preceded by: Józef Przybyszewski
- Succeeded by: Stefan Dybowski

Personal details
- Born: 17 January 1911 Puławy
- Died: 17 December 1975 (aged 64) Warsaw, Polish People's Republic
- Resting place: Powązki Military Cemetery
- Party: Polish Workers' Party (1942–1948)
- Spouse: Irena Sztachelska

Jerzy Sztachelski (January 17, 1911 – December 17, 1975) was a Polish physician and communist politician. He was a Member of the National Council, the Legislative Sejm and the Sejm of the Polish People's Republic of the 1st, 2nd, 3rd and 5th term as well as Minister of Provisions and Trade (1945–1947), Minister of Health (1951–1956), Minister without Portfolio (1956–1961) and again Minister of Health and Social Care (1961–1968).

== Biography ==
He was the son of Jarosław and Zofia. A graduate of the Stefan Batory University in Vilnius, he obtained a doctor of medicine degree. In the 1930s, he was associated with the communist circles of the Union of the Academic Left "Front", tried and acquitted in the trials of 1936–1937. From 1939 to 1941 he was the head of the health department in Vilnius, then until 1943 a doctor in the Red Army. From 1943, he was an officer of the Polish Armed Forces in the USSR and a participant in the Battle of Lenino as the commander of the Sanitary Battalion. From February to August 1944, secretary general of the main board of the Association of Polish Patriots.

From 1945 he was a member of the Polish Workers' Party and then the Polish United Workers' Party. From December 1945 to December 1948, deputy member of the Central Committee of the PPR, then (until November 1968) member of the Central Committee of the PZPR, in 1948–1954 member of the central party control commission. From August 1944 to April 1945, voivode of Białystok, then government representative for the Masurian District (March 1945), Minister of Supplies and Trade (1945–1947), undersecretary of state at the Ministry of Health (1947–1951), minister of health (1951–1956), minister without portfolio, Government Plenipotentiary for relations with the Church and head of the Office for Religious Affairs (1956–1961), and then again Minister of Health and Social Welfare until 1968. Member of the National Council, the Legislative Sejm and the Sejm of the Polish People's Republic I, II, 3rd and 5th term of office.

In 1949, he made efforts to establish the Medical University of Białystok. In recognition of these achievements, in 1960 he was the first to be awarded an honorary doctorate from this university.

In the 1950s, he was associated with the Puławy faction. President of the main board of the Society for the Promotion of Secular Culture (1969–1975), member of the National Committee of the National Unity Front in the late 1950s. From 1959, he was also one of the vice-presidents of the Supreme Council of ZBoWiD.

The fictionalized fate of Jerzy Sztachelski is the main motif of Jerzy Putrament's three-volume novel Wybrańcy. He was the husband of Irena Sztachelska.

He was buried at the Powązki Military Cemetery in Warsaw.

== Awards ==
- Order of the Banner of Labour
- Order of Polonia Restituta
- Order of the Cross of Grunwald
- Virtuti Militari
- Medal for Warsaw 1939–1945
- Badge of the 1000th Anniversary of the Polish State
- Badge of Honour "For Merit to Warsaw"
- Order of the National Flag (North Korea)
- Hungarian Order of Merit

Government offices
Preceded by Tadeusz Michejda	Minister of Health; 10 January 1951 – 13 November 1956	Succeeded by Rajmund Barański
Preceded by Rajmund Barański	Minister of Health; 18 May 1961 – 15 July 1968	Succeeded by Jan Karol Kostrzewski
