= Suwałki Voivodeship =

Voivodeship of Poland (1975–1998)

Suwałki Voivodeship Województwo suwalskie
- Voivodeship of Poland
- 1975–1998
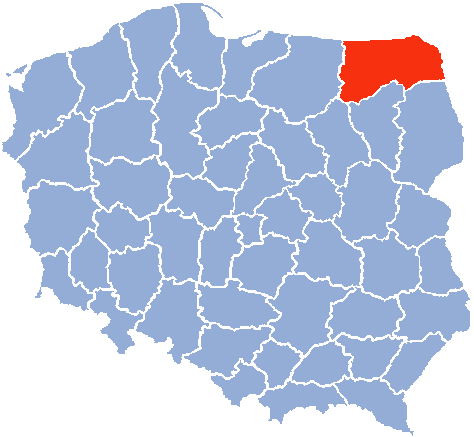
- Map of the People's Republic of Poland in 1975 with the Suwałki Voivodeship.
- Capital: Suwałki
- Area
  - Coordinates: 54°5′N 22°56′E
- History
  - Established: 1975
  - Disestablished: 1998
- Political subdivisions: Communes:
Preceded by	Succeeded by
Białystok Voivodeship (1945–75); Olsztyn Voivodeship	Podlaskie Voivodeship; Warmian-Masurian Voivodeship

Suwałki Voivodeship (Polish: województwo suwalskie) was an administrative division and local government in Poland from 1975 to 1998. In 1999 the Voidvodeship was divided in half and reassigned to two other Voivodeships – the eastern half to Podlaskie Voivodeship and the western half to Warmian-Masurian Voivodeship.

Its capital city was Suwałki.

== Cities and towns ==
Major cities and towns (population in 1998):

- Suwałki – 68,331 (1995 – 66,200)
- Ełk – 56,208 (1995 – 55,100)
- Giżycko – 31,484 (1995 – 30,600)
- Augustów – 30,162 (1995 – 29,600)
- Pisz – 19,571
- Olecko – 17,175
- Gołdap – 13,858
- Węgorzewo – 12,331
- Orzysz – 10,500
- Mikołajki – 3,793
- Ruciane-Nida – 4,593
- Biała Piska – 4,589

== Population ==
- 1975 – 414,700
- 1980 – 422,600
- 1985 – 449,000
- 1990 – 470,600
- 1995 – 485,600
- 1998 – 489,200

== See also ==
- Suwałki Region
- Suwałki County
