= Łomża Voivodeship =

Former administrative division of Poland

Łomża Voivodeship Województwo łomżyńskie
- Voivodeship of Poland
- 1975–1998
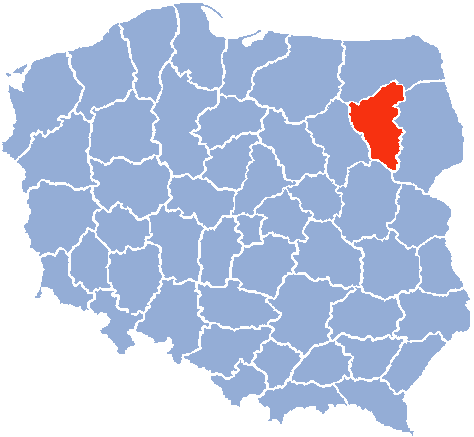
- Map of People's Republic of Poland in 1975 with the Łomża Voivodeship.
- Capital: Łomża
- Area
  - Coordinates: 53°10′N 22°5′E
- History
  - Established: 1975
  - Disestablished: 1998
- Political subdivisions: Communes:
Preceded by	Succeeded by
Białystok Voivodeship (1945–75); Warsaw Voivodeship (1945–75)	Podlaskie Voivodeship; Masovian Voivodeship

Łomża Voivodeship (Polish: województwo Łomżyńskie) was an administrative division and local government in Poland in the years 1975 to 1998, superseded by the Podlaskie Voivodeship.

Its capital city was Łomża.

== Cities and towns ==
Major cities and towns (population in 1998):

- Łomża – 64,605 (1995 – 63,000)
- Zambrów – 23,879 (1995 – 23,600)
- Grajewo – 22,966 (1995 – 22,400)
- Kolno – 11,180

== Population ==
- 1975 – 320,200
- 1980 – 325,800
- 1985 – 338,700
- 1990 – 346,700
- 1995 – 353,800
- 1998 – 352,900
