= Zawyki =

- Village
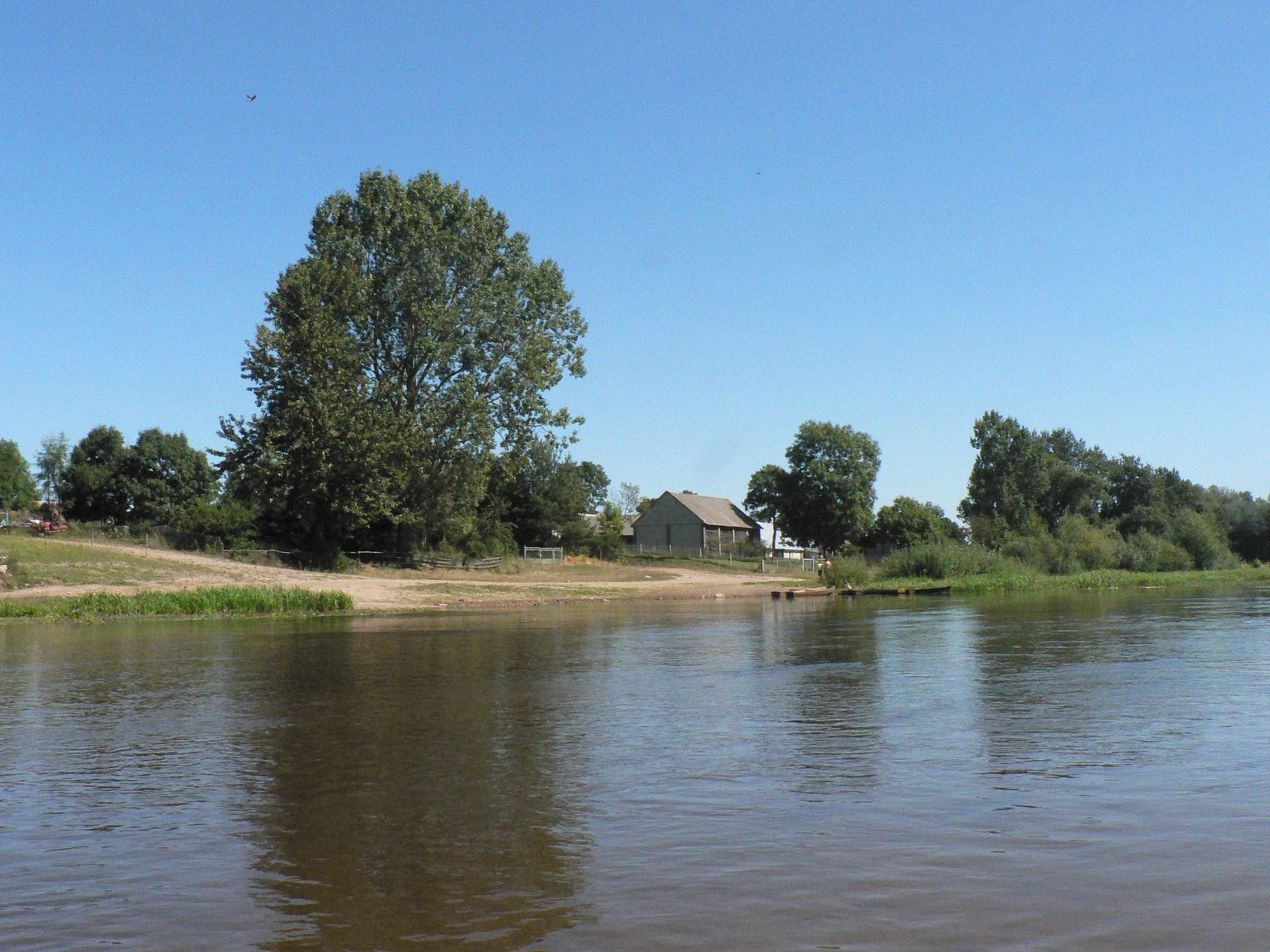

- Location within Poland
- Coordinates: 52°55′N 23°1′E
- Country: Poland
- Voivodeship: Podlaskie
- County: Białystok
- Gmina: Suraż

Zawyki [zaˈvɨki] is a village in the administrative district of Gmina Suraż, within Białystok County, Podlaskie Voivodeship, in north-eastern Poland.

According to the 1921 census, the village was inhabited by 427 people, among whom 380 were Roman Catholic, 43 Orthodox, and 4 Mosaic. At the same time, 421 inhabitants declared Polish nationality, 2 Belarusian and 4 Jewish. There were 80 residential buildings in the village.
