= Władysław Michejda =

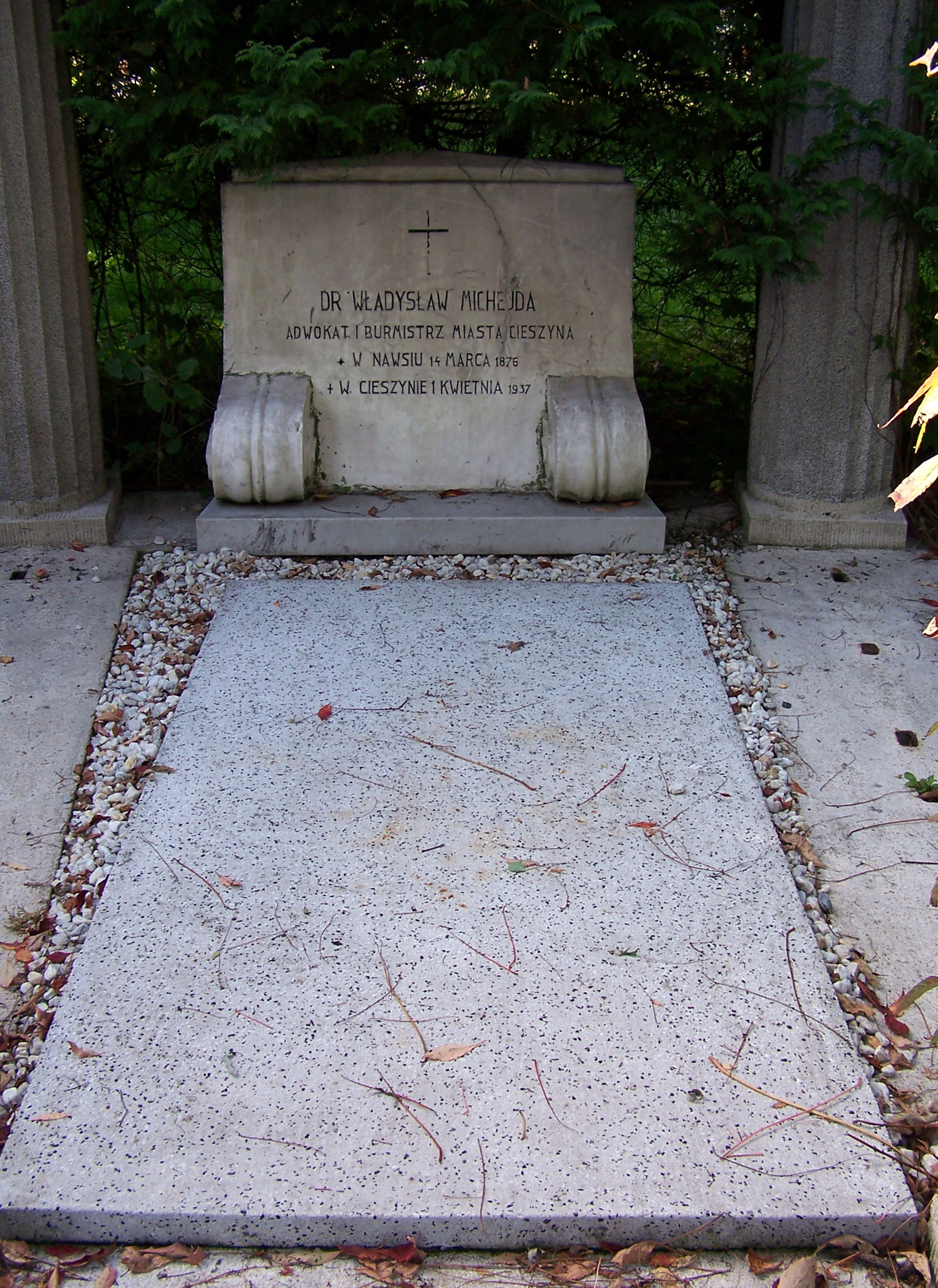
Grave of Władysław Michejda at the Communal Cemetery in Cieszyn

Władysław Michejda (14 March 1876 in Nawsie - 1 April 1937 in Cieszyn) was a Polish barrister and Mayor of Cieszyn from 1929 to 1937.

Son of Franciszek, Lutheran pastor. Brother of Tadeusz. He graduated from high school in Cieszyn and from the Faculty of Law of the Jagiellonian University in Kraków. He became doctor of law in 1904 and worked as a barrister in Lwów since 1908. Michejda returned to Cieszyn in 1919, where he opened his lawyer office.

In 1929 he became mayor of Cieszyn and served in this office until 1937.

Political offices
Preceded by Józef Londzin	Mayor of Cieszyn; 1929 – 1937	Succeeded by Rudolf Halfar
