= Polish Radio and Television =

Committee of Radio and Television "Polish Radio and Television" (Polish: Komitet do Spraw Radia i Telewizji "Polskie Radio i Telewizja") (also called as a Radiocomittee - Radiokomitet) was an institution, which managed all stations of Polish Television and Polish Radio in Polish People's Republic (PRL), and in the early days of the Third Polish Republic. It was replaced by two sole-shareholder companies of the State Treasury in 1993 — Polish Radio and Polish Television.
