= Tadeusz Michejda =

Polish physician and politician

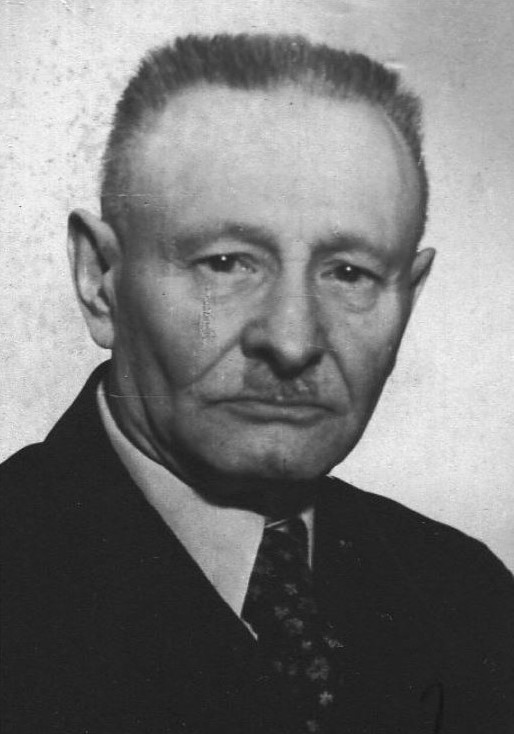

Minister of Health of Poland
- In office February 1947 – 10 January 1951
- Prime Minister: Józef Cyrankiewicz
- Preceded by: Franciszek Litwin
- Succeeded by: Jerzy Sztachelski

Member of the Polish Senate
- In office 1930–1935

Member of the State National Council
- In office 1945–1946

Member of the Sejm
- In office 1947–1952

Personal details
- Born: 26 September 1879 Nawsie, Austria-Hungary
- Died: 18 May 1956 (aged 76) Warsaw, Poland
- Resting place: Rakowicki Cemetery, Kraków
- Occupation: Physician

Tadeusz Michejda (26 September 1879 in Nawsie – 18 May 1956 in Warsaw) was a Polish physician and politician. Brother of Władysław.

== Biography ==
Tadeusz Michejda was born on 26 September 1879 in Nawsie to Franciszek Michejda, a Lutheran pastor, and Anna Roiczek. He graduated from a state gymnasium in Cieszyn and later studied medicine at universities in Kraków, Prague and Vienna. After graduation, Michejda worked as a doctor in Vienna and Tuchów, later becoming a municipal doctor in Horní Suchá.

After World War I he was a member of Rada Narodowa Księstwa Cieszyńskego (National Council of the Duchy of Cieszyn) and worked on preparations to hold a plebiscite in Cieszyn Silesia. In 1920 Cieszyn Silesia was divided between Czechoslovakia and Poland. His hometown and the workplace fell to Czechoslovakia and Michejda left the Trans-Olza area as he was an active pro-Polish activist; he stayed in Poland, where he worked many years in several localities, including Działdowo, as a doctor. He was a senator in the Polish Senate for the National Workers' Party from 1930 to 1935, deputy in the State National Council in 1945–1946 and deputy in the Sejm from 1947 to 1952. Michejda was also a Minister of Health from 1947 to 1951 and a Minister without Portfolio from 1951 to 1952. Michejda was since 1950 a member of the Democratic Party, and a vice-chairman of the Polish Red Cross. Tadeusz Michejda died in Warsaw and is buried at the Rakowicki Cemetery in Kraków.

Government offices
Preceded by Franciszek Litwin	Minister of Health; 1947–1951	Succeeded by Jerzy Sztachelski
