= Pruss =

Pruss is a German language habitational surname for someone from Prussia. Notable people with the name include:

- Alexander Pruss (1973), Canadian philosopher, mathematician
- Carl Pruss (1818–1886), Prussian Lithuanian teacher and businessman
- Johann Adam Woldemar Pruss (1875–1935), Russian military doctor
- Max Pruss (1891–1960), commanding captain of the zeppelin LZ 129 Hindenburg
- Michael Pruss British film producer
- Vladimir Pruss (1906–1970s), Soviet historian

== See also ==
- Preiss, another surname
- Preuss, another surname
- Prussing, another surname
