= Krzywe =

Krzywe may refer to the following places:

- Krzywe, Brzozów County in Subcarpathian Voivodeship (south-east Poland)
- Krzywe, Ełk County in Warmian-Masurian Voivodeship (north Poland)
- Krzywe, Giżycko County in Warmian-Masurian Voivodeship (north Poland)
- Krzywe Koło-Kolonia (north Poland)
- Krzywe Kolano (north Poland)
- Krzywe Koło (north Poland)
- Krzywe Lake (north east Poland)
- Krzywe, Lesko County in Subcarpathian Voivodeship (south-east Poland)
- Krzywe, Lubaczów County in Subcarpathian Voivodeship (south-east Poland)
- Krzywe, Lublin Voivodeship (east Poland)
- Nowe Krzywe (north Poland)
- Krzywe, Podlaskie Voivodeship (north-east Poland)
- Stare Krzywe (north east Poland)
- Krzywe, Mrągowo County in Warmian-Masurian Voivodeship (north Poland)
- Krzywe, Olecko County in Warmian-Masurian Voivodeship (north Poland)
