= Carl Pruss =

- Born: 23 December 1818; Schikorren, East Prussia
- Died: 1886 (aged 67–68); Skomentnen, East Prussia
- Occupations: teacher, businessman

Carl Pruss (1818–1886) was a Prussian Lithuanian teacher and businessman. He is the earliest reliably known ancestor of the Pruss family most notable for its members who emigrated to the Russian Empire.

== Biography ==
Pruss was born in a Lithuanian Lutheran family in the Prussian village of Schikorren, currently known as Sikory Juskie, Poland. According to the records of the parish church in Stradaunen, his parents were Gottlieb Pruss and Catharine Erdtowna. He likely studied in a nearby city such as Lyck or Gumbinnen. In the 1840s, he moved to Skomentnen, today called Skomętno Wielkie, where he became the village teacher, a position he kept until his death.

In May 1865, Pruss founded a fire insurance society called Masowia which operated in rural areas around Skomentnen, including Kallinowen, Marczynowen, Wierzbowen, Dluggen and Mikolaiken. According to the regional newspaper Thorner Presse, at first the company was successful, but later "the local peasants were unwilling to pay for insurance". At some point, the small claims court in Lyck had to make about a thousand rulings related to Masowia's clients in just one year.

== Family ==
Carl Pruss married Louise Gillet from Dorschen, daughter of a government official of French ancestry. They had 7 children. One of them, Heinrich Adolph Pruss, emigrated to the Russian Empire and settled in what is now Belarus, where he worked as a railway station master and married Anna Elizabete Priede from Latvia. Their descendants include medical doctor Johann Adam Woldemar Pruss who took part in the Russian Civil War, historian Vladimir Pruss who founded the history department at the university of Atyrau, Kazakhstan, and journalist Irina Pruss who edited the popular science magazine Znanie — Sila for over 40 years.
