= Prussing =

Prussing is a surname. Notable people with the surname include:

- Eugene Prussing (1855–1936), American entertainment lawyer and philanthropist
- Jean Prussing, a.k.a. Jean Burden (1914–2008), American poet, essayist, and author
- Laurel Lunt Prussing (born 1941), American politician
- Louise Prussing (1895–1994), American actress
- Margaret Prussing (1890–1944), American actress and screenwriter

== See also ==
- Pruss, another surname
