= Płowce (disambiguation) =

Płowce may refer to the following places:

- Płowce in Kuyavian-Pomeranian Voivodeship (north-central Poland)
- Płowce, Subcarpathian Voivodeship (south-east Poland)
- Płowce, Warmian-Masurian Voivodeship (north Poland)
