= Grabnik =

Grabnik may refer to the following places:

- Grabnik, Gmina Adamów in Lublin Voivodeship (east Poland)
- Grabnik, Gmina Krasnobród in Lublin Voivodeship (east Poland)
- Grabnik, Podlaskie Voivodeship (north-east Poland)
- Grabnik, Grodzisk Mazowiecki County in Masovian Voivodeship (east-central Poland)
- Grabnik, Ostrołęka County in Masovian Voivodeship (east-central Poland)
- Grabnik, Warsaw West County in Masovian Voivodeship (east-central Poland)
- Grabnik, Ełk County in Warmian-Masurian Voivodeship (north Poland)
- Grabnik, Mrągowo County in Warmian-Masurian Voivodeship (north Poland)
