= Liski, Ełk County =

Liski
- Village
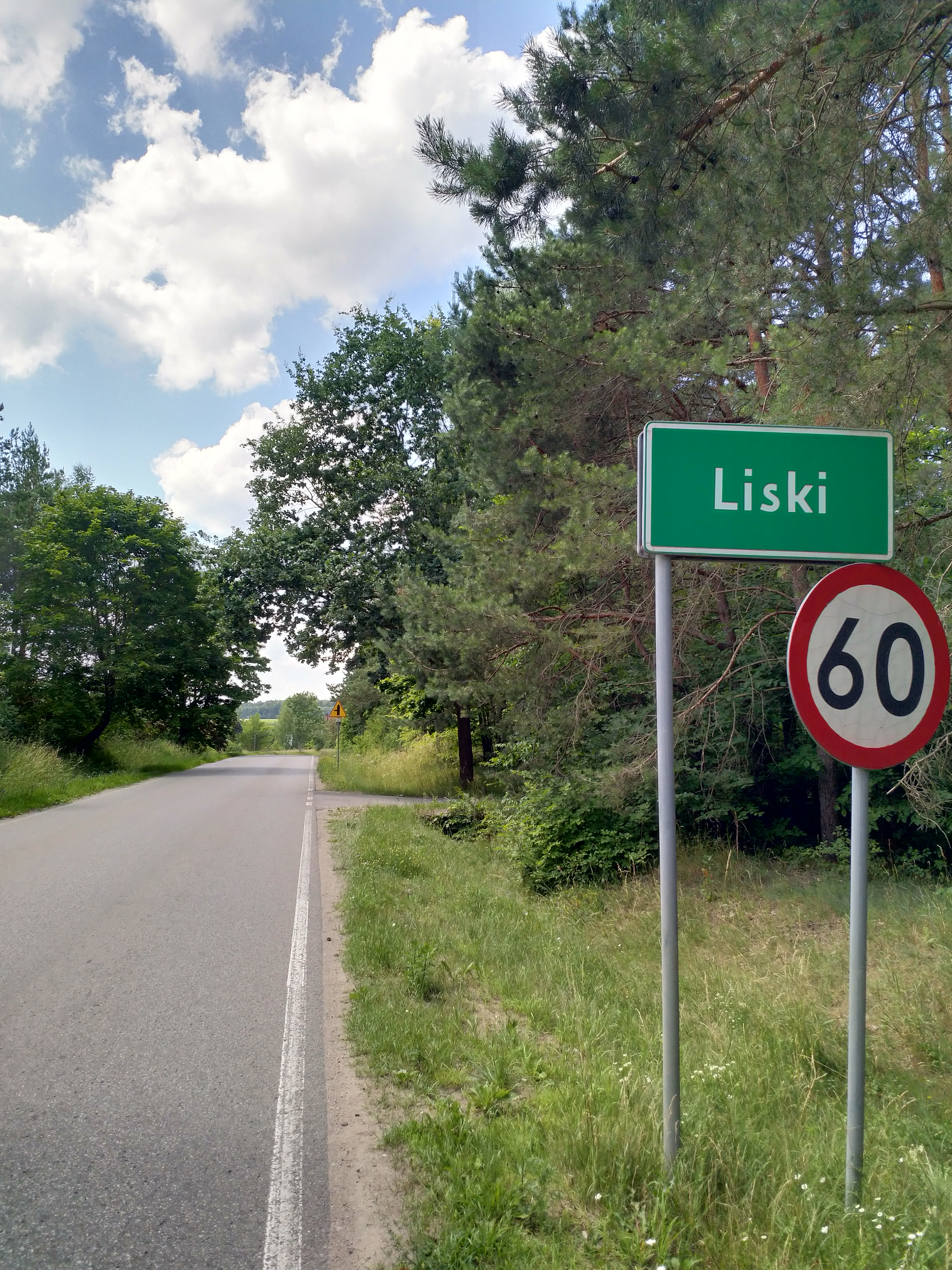
- (2023)

- Location within Poland
- Coordinates: 53°54′36″N 22°10′50″E
- Country: Poland
- Voivodeship: Warmian-Masurian
- County: Ełk
- Gmina: Stare Juchy

Liski [ˈliski] is a village in the administrative district of Gmina Stare Juchy, within Ełk County, Warmian-Masurian Voivodeship, in northern Poland.
