= Gmina Stare Juchy =

Gmina Stare Juchy Stare Juchy Commune
- Gmina
- Coat of arms
- Interactive map of Gmina Stare Juchy
- Coordinates (Stare Juchy): 53°55′15″N 22°10′15″E
- Country: Poland
- Voivodeship: Warmian-Masurian
- County: Ełk
- Seat: Stare Juchy

Area
  - Total: 196.55 km^{2} (75.89 sq mi)

Population (2011)
  - Total: 3,969
  - Density: 20.19/km^{2} (52.30/sq mi)
- Website: http://www.stare-juchy.pl

Gmina Stare Juchy is a rural gmina (administrative district) in Ełk County, Warmian-Masurian Voivodeship, in northern Poland. Its seat is the village of Stare Juchy, which lies approximately 17 kilometres (11 mi) north-west of Ełk and 111 km (69 mi) east of the regional capital Olsztyn.

The gmina covers an area of 196.55 square kilometres (75.9 sq mi), and as of 2006 its total population is 4,006 (3,969 in 2011).

== Villages ==
Gmina Stare Juchy contains the villages and settlements of Bałamutowo, Czerwonka, Dobra Wola, Gorło, Gorłówko, Grabnik, Jeziorowskie, Kałtki, Królowa Wola, Laśmiady, Liski, Nowe Krzywe, Olszewo, Orzechowo, Ostrów, Panistruga, Płowce, Rogale, Rogalik, Sikory Juskie, Skomack Wielki, Stare Juchy, Stare Krzywe, Szczecinowo and Zawady Ełckie.

== Neighbouring gminas ==
Gmina Stare Juchy is bordered by the gminas of Ełk, Orzysz, Świętajno, and Wydminy.
