= Bałamutowo =

- Village
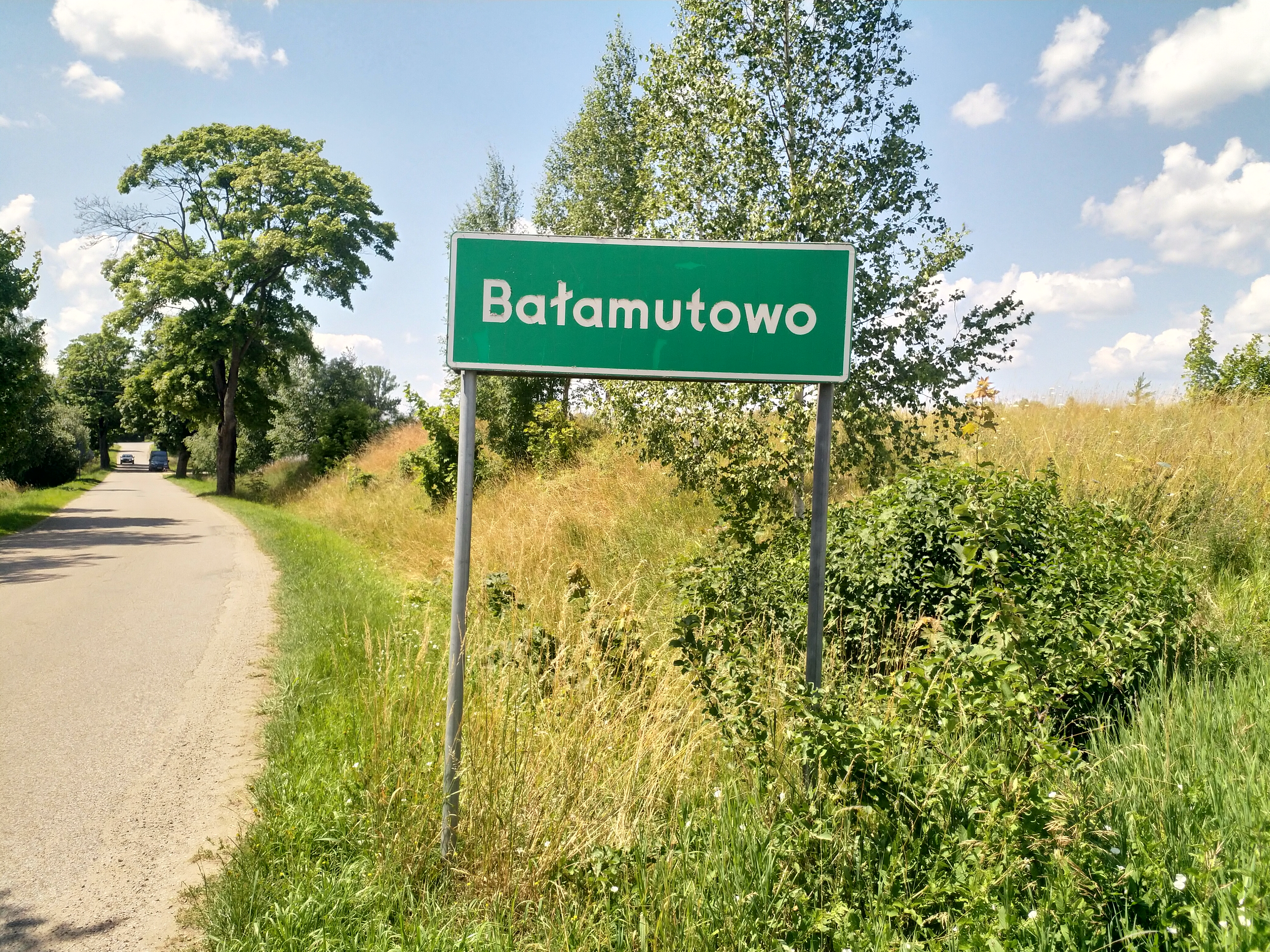
- (2023)

- Location within Poland
- Coordinates: 53°54′N 22°15′E
- Country: Poland
- Voivodeship: Warmian-Masurian
- County: Ełk
- Gmina: Stare Juchy
- Population: 64

Bałamutowo [bawamuˈtɔvɔ] is a village in the administrative district of Gmina Stare Juchy, within Ełk County, Warmian-Masurian Voivodeship, in northern Poland.
