= Orzechowo, Ełk County =

Orzechowo
- Village
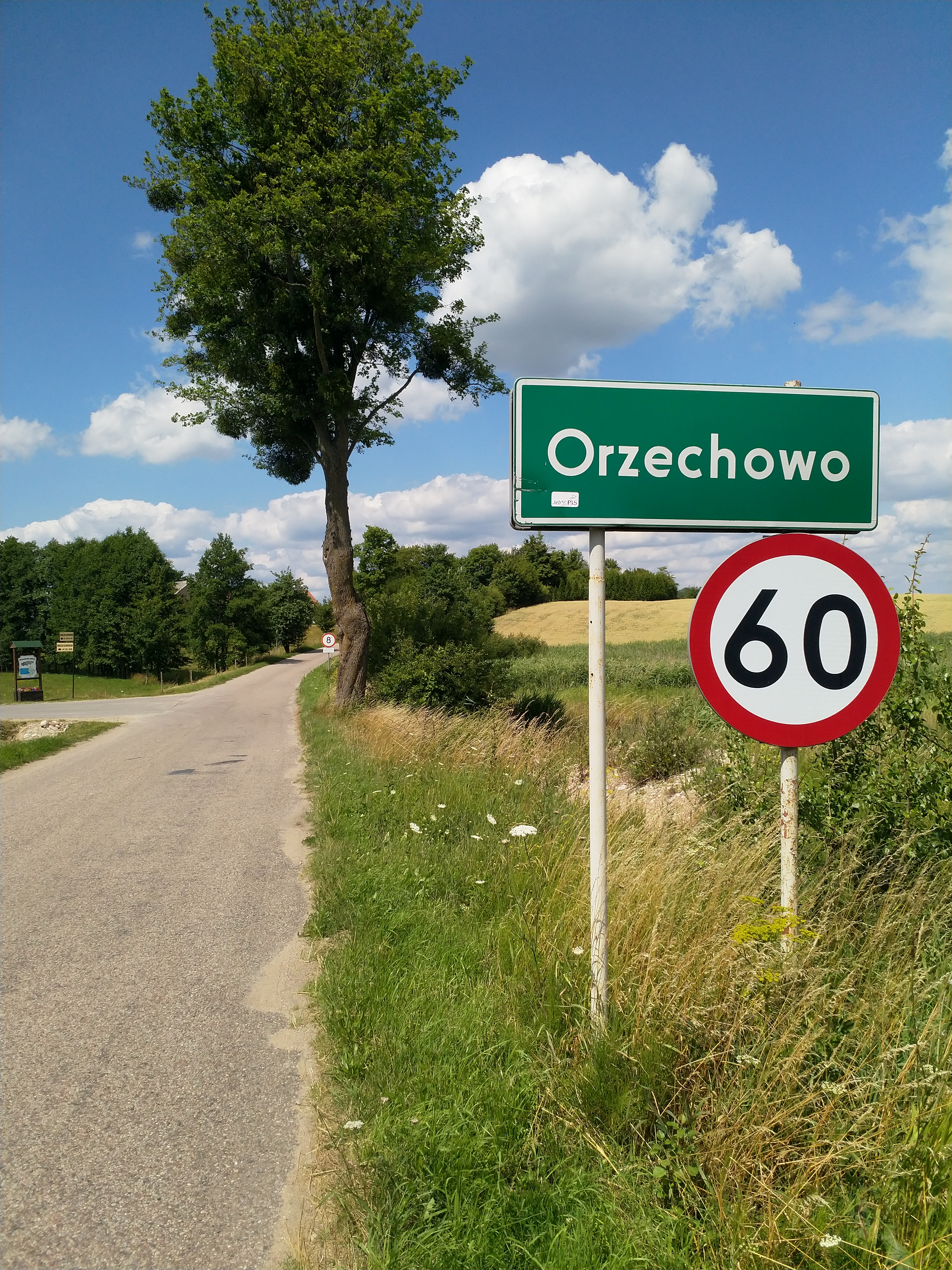
- (2023)

- Location within Poland
- Coordinates: 53°58′N 22°9′E
- Country: Poland
- Voivodeship: Warmian-Masurian
- County: Ełk
- Gmina: Stare Juchy
- Time zone: UTC+1 (CET)
  - Summer (DST): UTC+2 (CEST)
- Vehicle registration: NEL

Orzechowo [ɔʐɛˈxɔvɔ] is a village in the administrative district of Gmina Stare Juchy, within Ełk County, Warmian-Masurian Voivodeship, in north-eastern Poland. It is located on the southwestern shore of Lake Szóstak in the region of Masuria.

== History ==
As of 1600 and 1719, the village had an exclusively Polish population. The name of the village is of Polish origin, and comes from the word orzech, which means "nut". In the late 19th century, the village had a population of 635. In 1924, the Germans renamed it to Nußberg in attempt to erase traces of Polish origin. After Germany's defeat in World War II, in 1945, the village became again part of Poland and its historic Polish name was restored.
