= Ostrów, Warmian-Masurian Voivodeship =

Ostrów
- Village
- Location within Poland
- Coordinates: 53°50′36″N 22°3′18″E
- Country: Poland
- Voivodeship: Warmian-Masurian
- County: Ełk
- Gmina: Stare Juchy
- Population: 90

Ostrów [ˈɔstruf] is a village in the administrative district of Gmina Stare Juchy, within Ełk County, Warmian-Masurian Voivodeship, in northern Poland.
