= Zawady Ełckie =

- Village
- Location within Poland
- Coordinates: 53°56′N 22°14′E
- Country: Poland
- Voivodeship: Warmian-Masurian
- County: Ełk
- Gmina: Stare Juchy
- Population: 110

Zawady Ełckie [zaˈvadɨ ˈɛu̯t͡skʲɛ] is a village in the administrative district of Gmina Stare Juchy, within Ełk County, Warmian-Masurian Voivodeship, in northern Poland.
