= Królowa Wola, Warmian-Masurian Voivodeship =

Królowa Wola
- Village
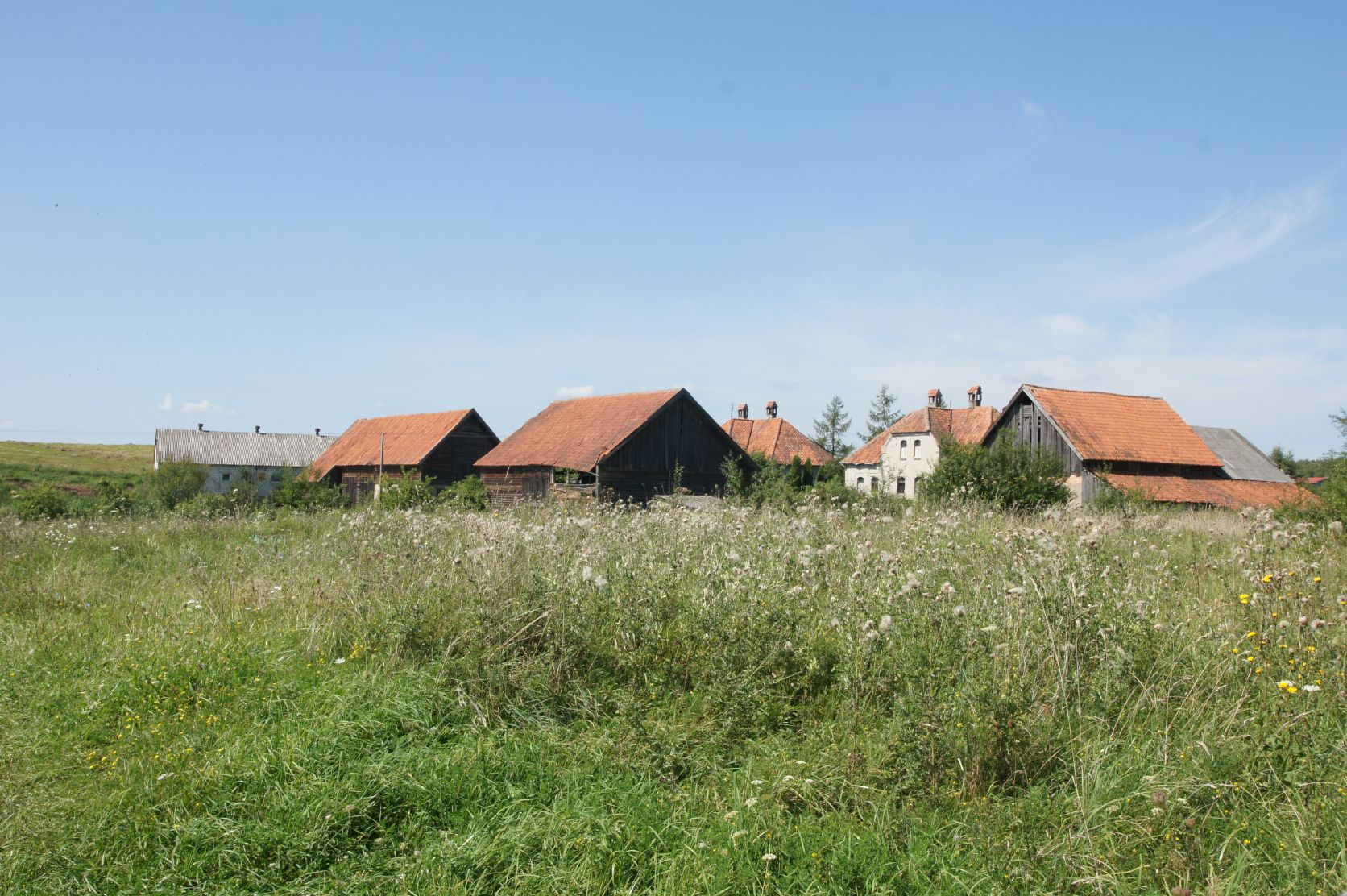

- Location within Poland
- Coordinates: 53°53′N 22°16′E
- Country: Poland
- Voivodeship: Warmian-Masurian
- County: Ełk
- Gmina: Stare Juchy

Królowa Wola [kruˈlɔva ˈvɔla] is a village in the administrative district of Gmina Stare Juchy, within Ełk County, Warmian-Masurian Voivodeship, in northern Poland.
