= Rogale, Ełk County =

Rogale
- Village
- Location within Poland
- Coordinates: 53°51′N 22°10′E
- Country: Poland
- Voivodeship: Warmian-Masurian
- County: Ełk
- Gmina: Stare Juchy
- Time zone: UTC+1 (CET)
  - Summer (DST): UTC+2 (CEST)
- Vehicle registration: NEL

Rogale [rɔˈɡalɛ] is a village in the administrative district of Gmina Stare Juchy, within Ełk County, Warmian-Masurian Voivodeship, in north-eastern Poland. It is located in the region of Masuria.

The village was historically known in Polish also as Rogale Wielkie. Under Nazi Germany, it was renamed Gahlen to erase traces of Polish origin.
