= Szczecinowo =

- Village
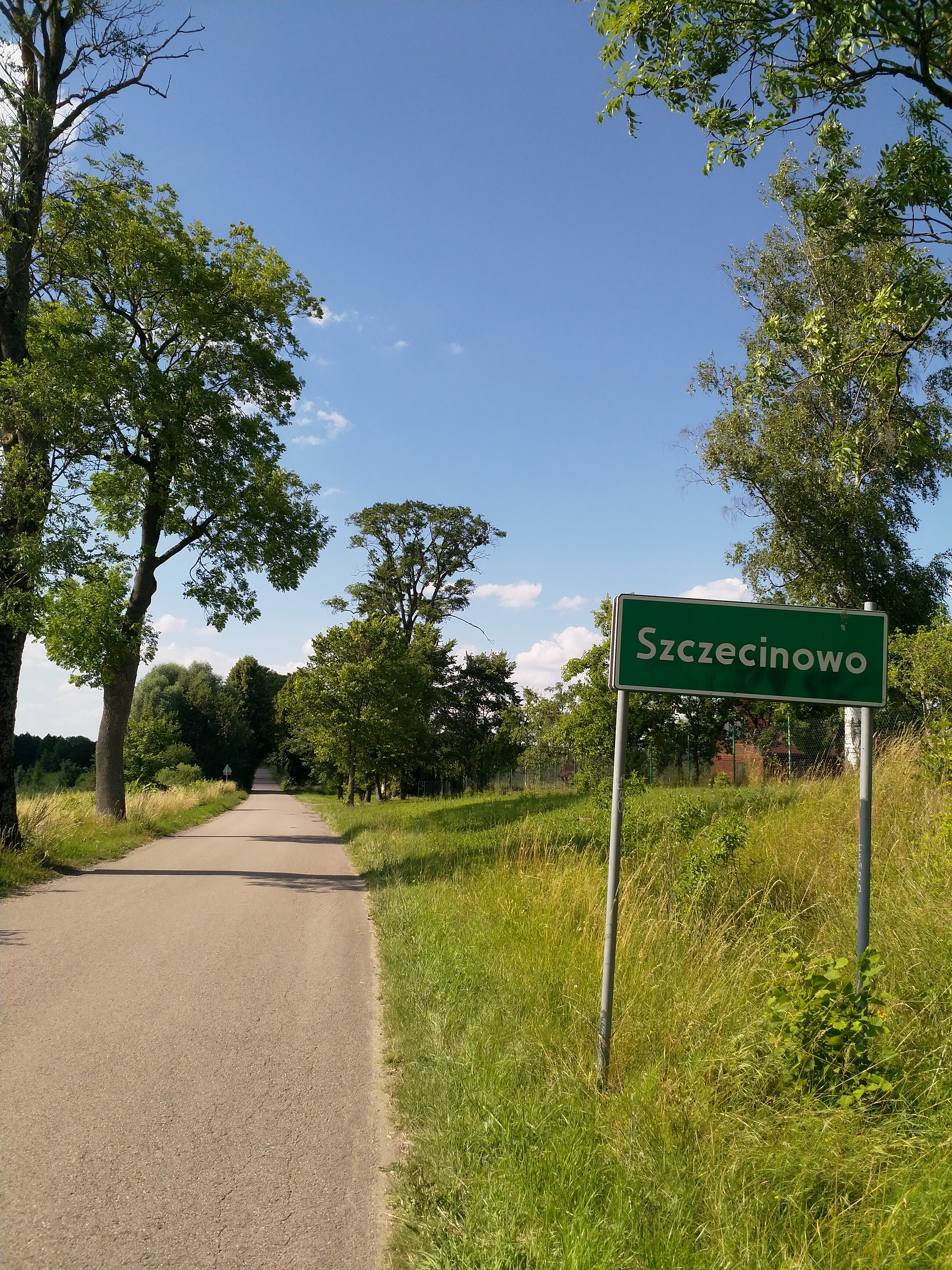
- (2023)

- Location within Poland
- Coordinates: 53°58′N 22°10′E
- Country: Poland
- Voivodeship: Warmian-Masurian
- County: Ełk
- Gmina: Stare Juchy

Szczecinowo [ʂt͡ʂɛt͡ɕiˈnɔvɔ] is a village in the administrative district of Gmina Stare Juchy, within Ełk County, Warmian-Masurian Voivodeship, in northern Poland.
