= Jeziorowskie, Ełk County =

Jeziorowskie
- Village
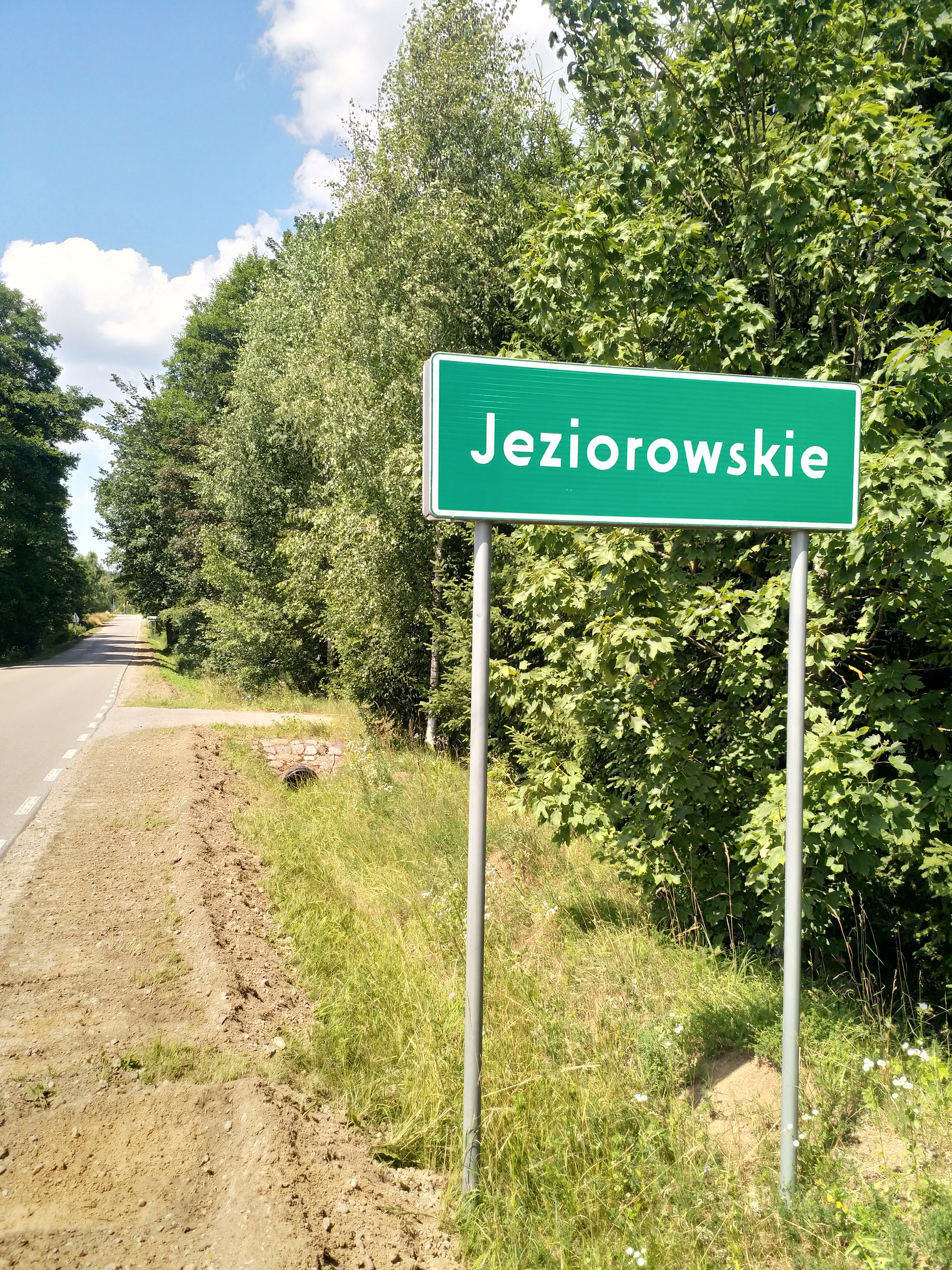
- (2023)

- Location within Poland
- Coordinates: 53°55′N 22°14′E
- Country: Poland
- Voivodeship: Warmian-Masurian
- County: Ełk
- Gmina: Stare Juchy

Jeziorowskie [jɛʑɔˈrɔfskʲɛ] is a village in the administrative district of Gmina Stare Juchy, within Ełk County, Warmian-Masurian Voivodeship, in northern Poland.
