= Skomack Wielki =

- Village
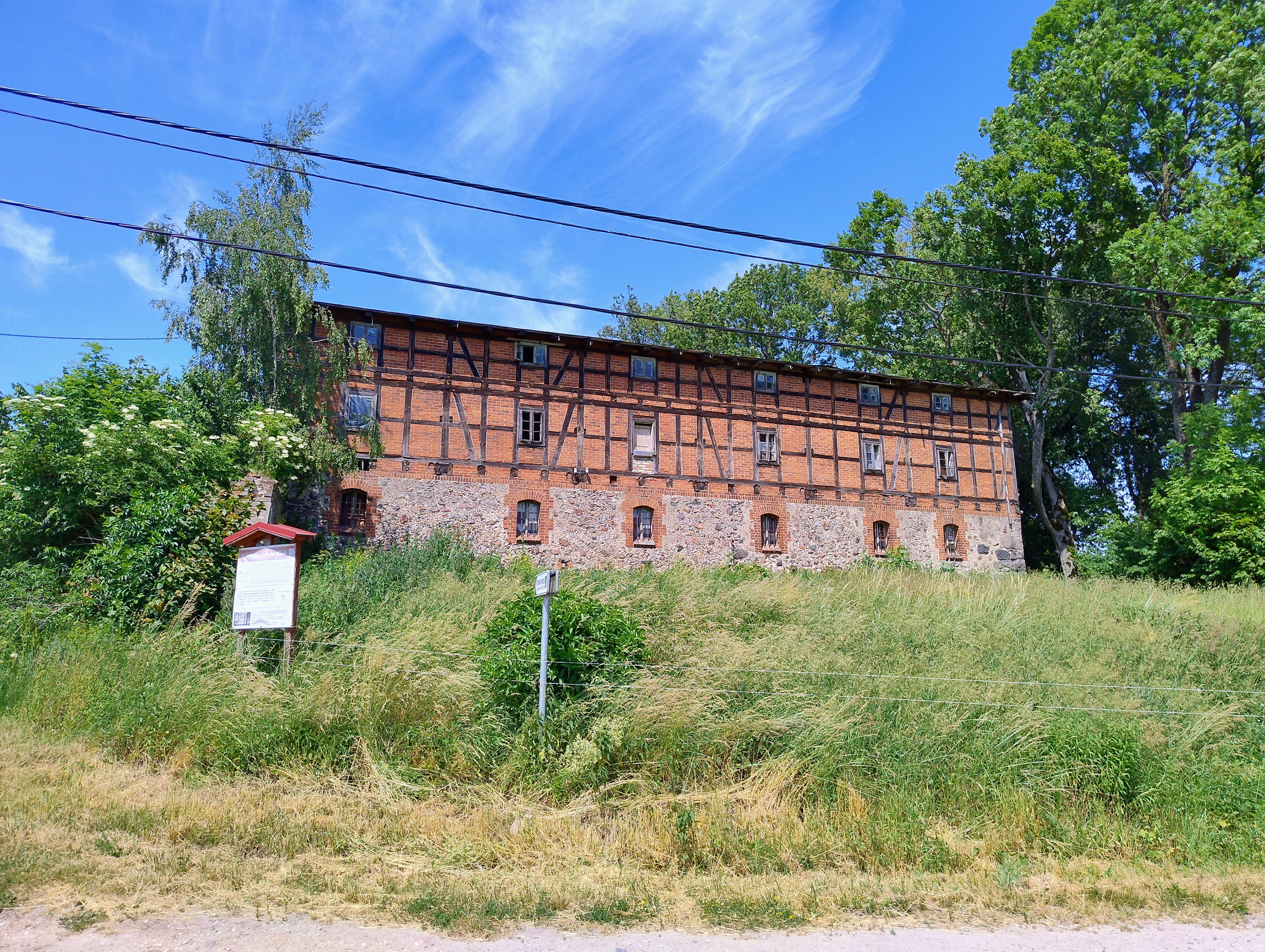
- Skomack Wielki (2025)

- Location within Poland
- Coordinates: 53°52′N 22°5′E
- Country: Poland
- Voivodeship: Warmian-Masurian
- County: Ełk
- Gmina: Stare Juchy

Skomack Wielki (Polish pronunciation: [ˈskɔmatsk ˈfjɛlkʲi]) is a village in the administrative district of Gmina Stare Juchy, within Ełk County, Warmian-Masurian Voivodeship, in northern Poland.
