= Olszewo, Gmina Stare Juchy =

Olszewo
- Village
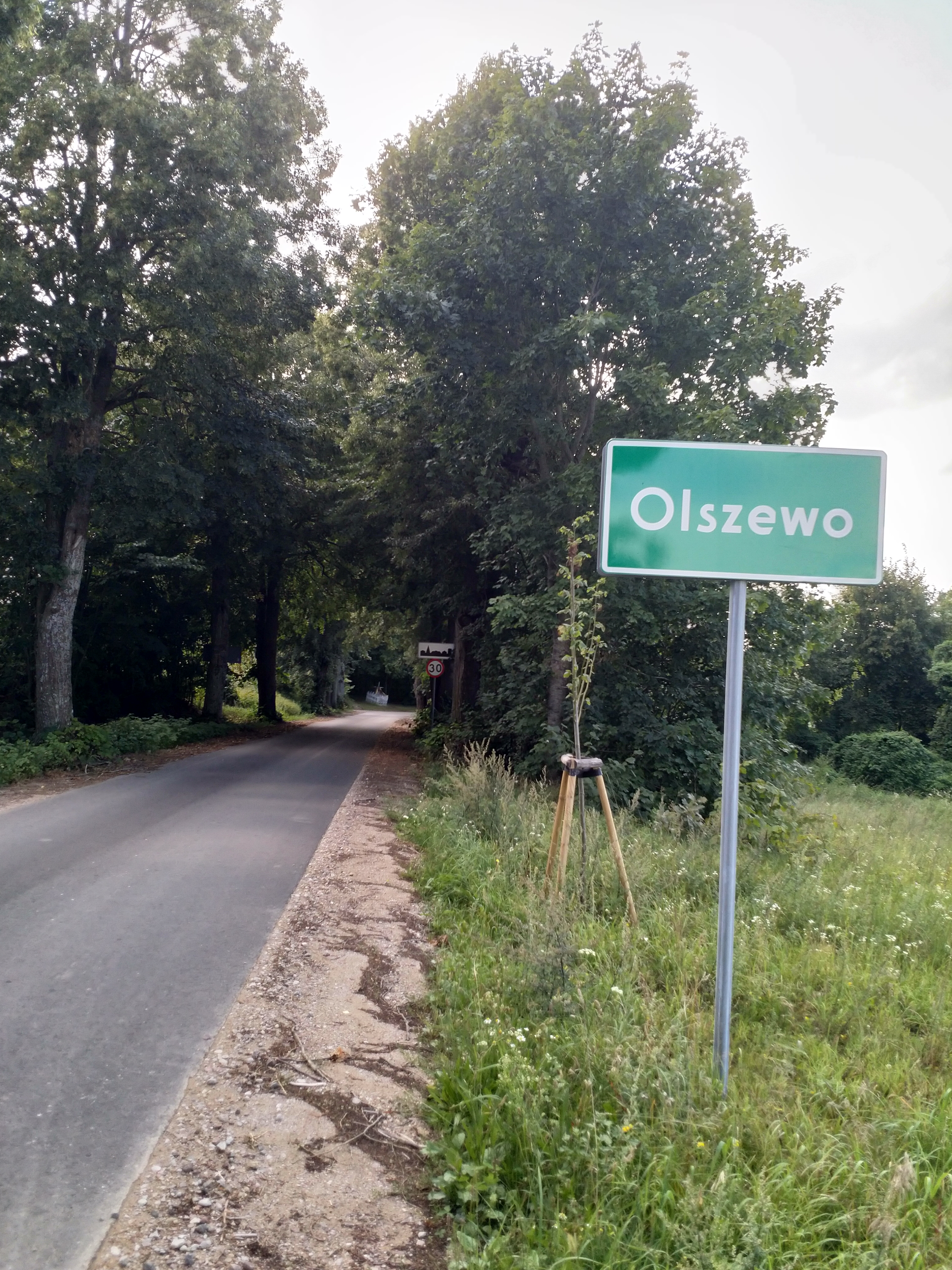
- Olszewo (2024)

- Location within Poland
- Coordinates: 53°55′N 22°8′E
- Country: Poland
- Voivodeship: Warmian-Masurian
- County: Ełk
- Gmina: Stare Juchy
- Population: 40

Olszewo [ɔlˈʂɛvɔ] is a village in the administrative district of Gmina Stare Juchy, within Ełk County, Warmian-Masurian Voivodeship, in northern Poland.
