= Laśmiady =

- Village
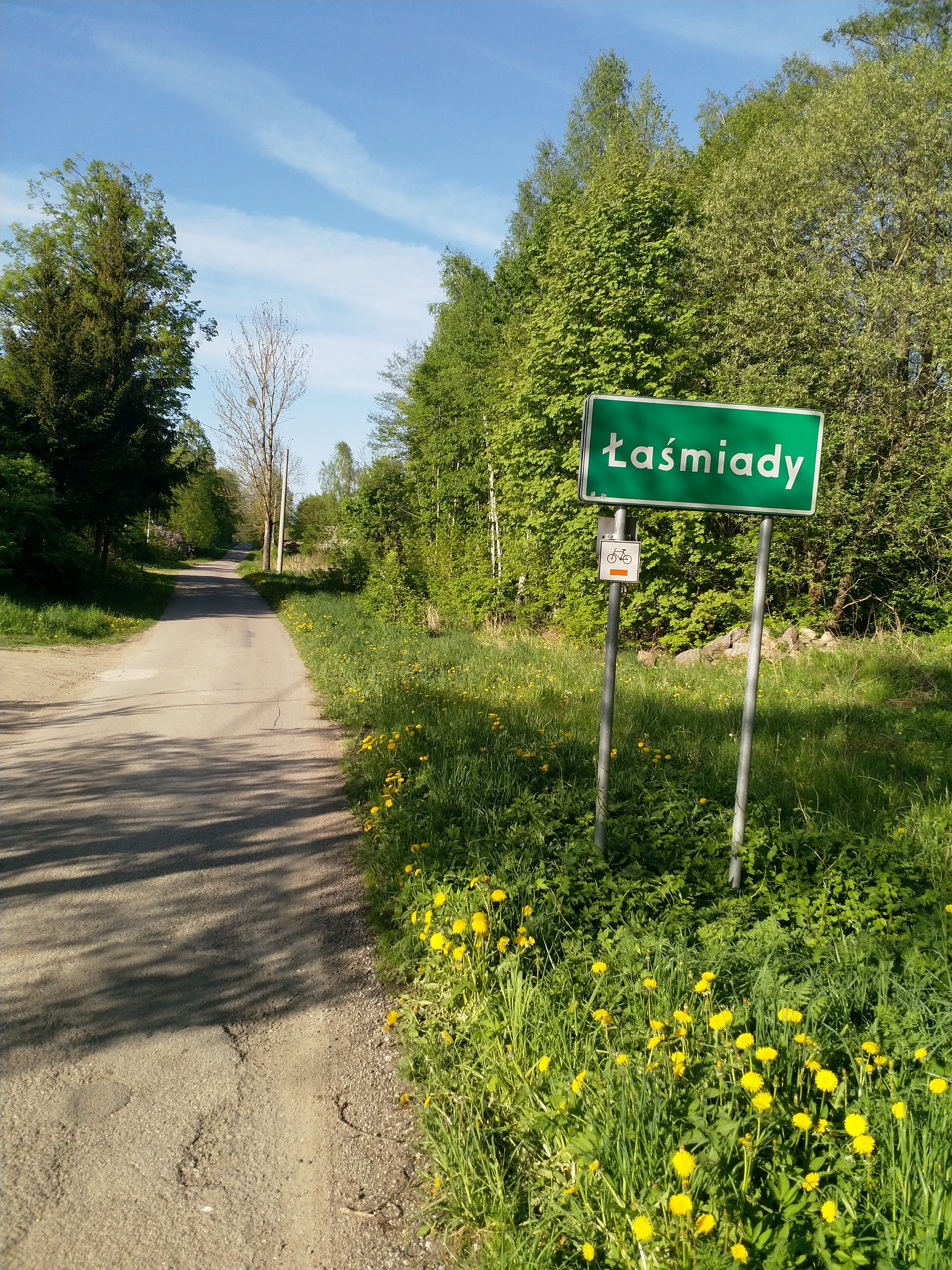

- Location within Poland
- Coordinates: 53°55′N 22°16′E
- Country: Poland
- Voivodeship: Warmian-Masurian
- County: Ełk
- Gmina: Stare Juchy

Laśmiady (Łaśmiady) [laɕˈmjadɨ] is a village in the administrative district of Gmina Stare Juchy, within Ełk County, Warmian-Masurian Voivodeship, in northern Poland.
