= Stare Juchy =

- Village
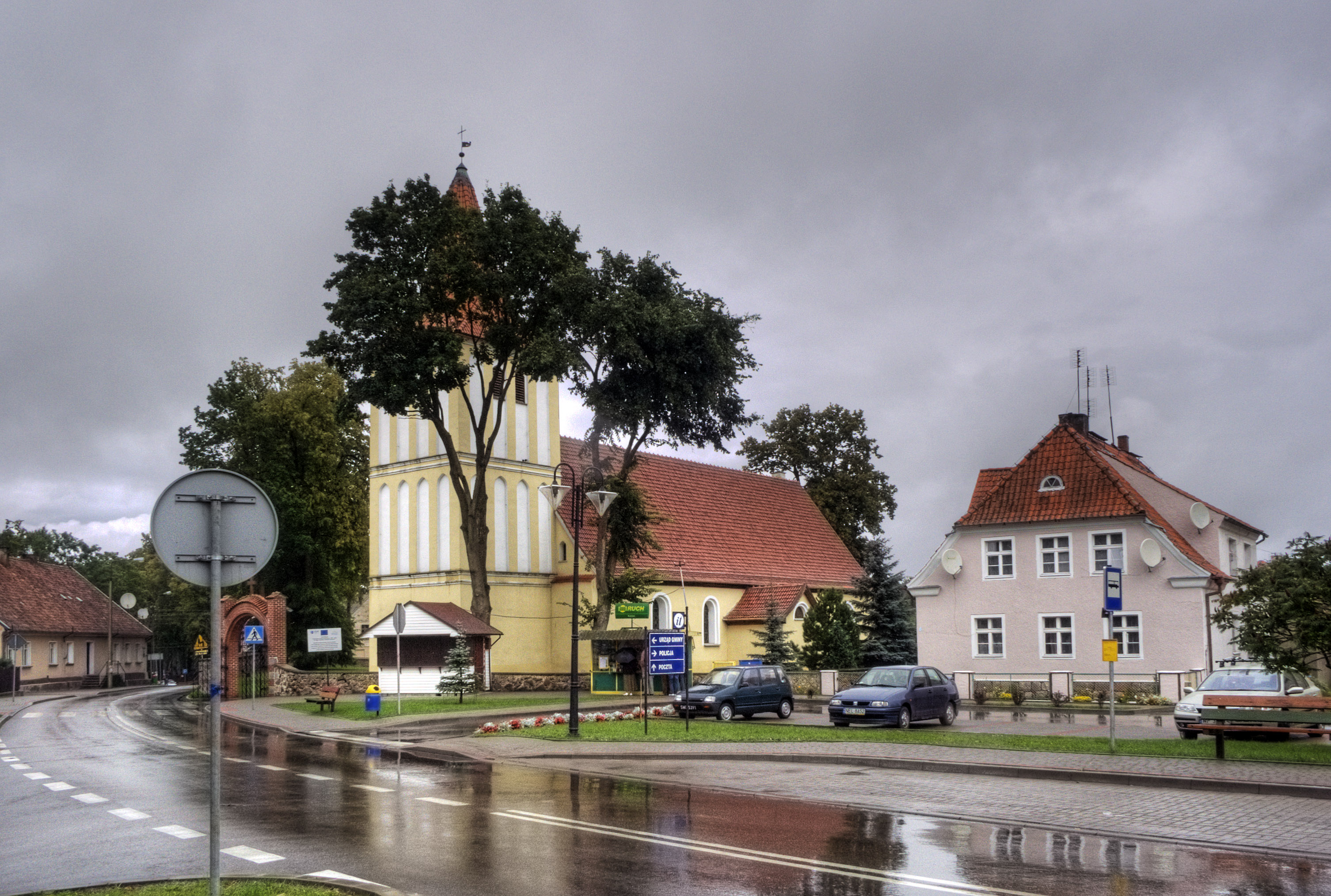
- Town centre and church

- Location within Poland
- Coordinates: 53°55′15″N 22°10′15″E
- Country: Poland
- Voivodeship: Warmian-Masurian
- County: Ełk
- Gmina: Stare Juchy
- Population: 1,800

Stare Juchy [ˈstarɛ ˈjuxɨ] is a village in Ełk County, Warmian-Masurian Voivodeship, in northern Poland. It is the seat of the gmina (administrative district) called Gmina Stare Juchy.
