= Antonio Pimentel de Prado =

Spanish officer

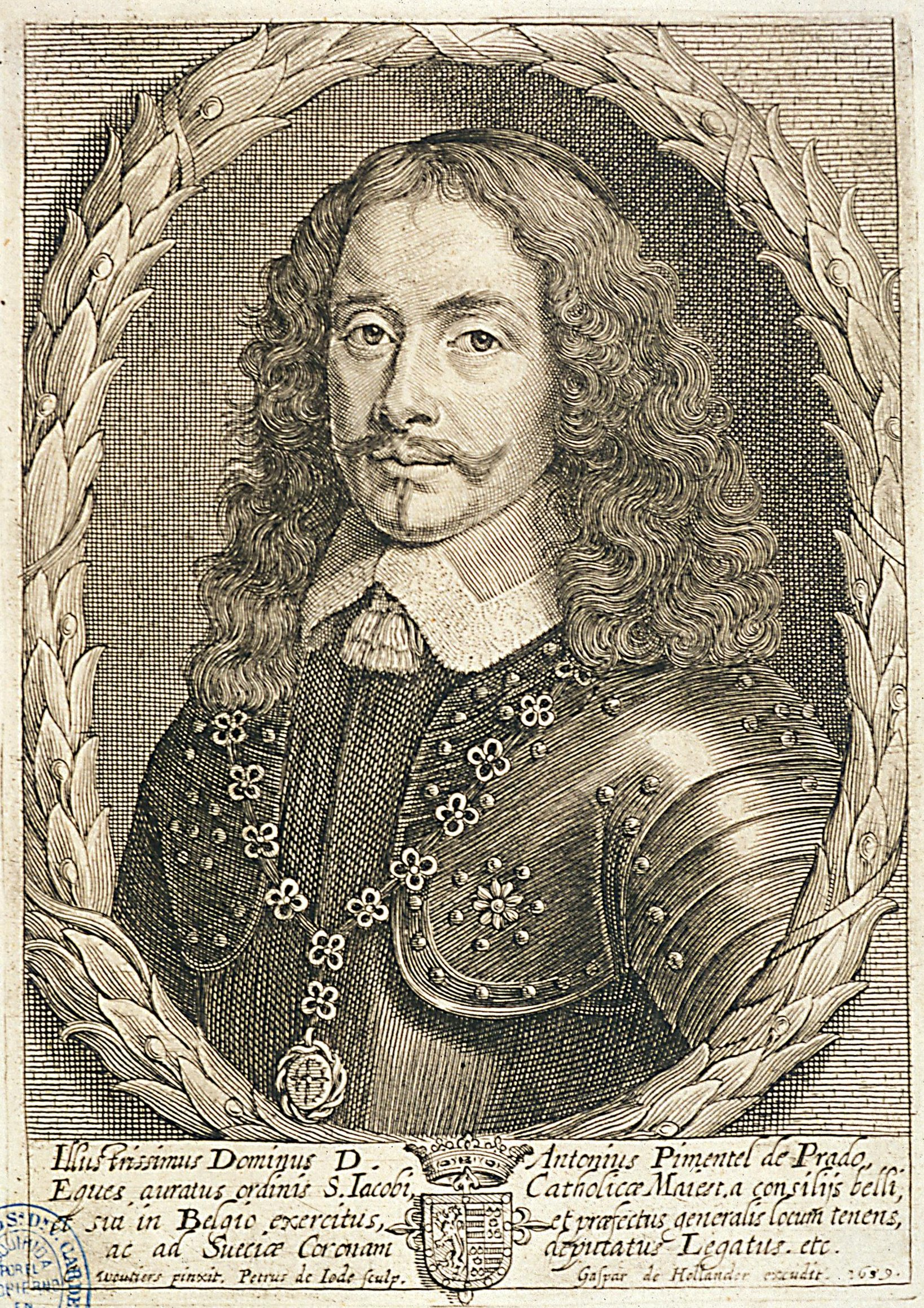
Don Antonio Pimentel de Prado (1604-1671/72)

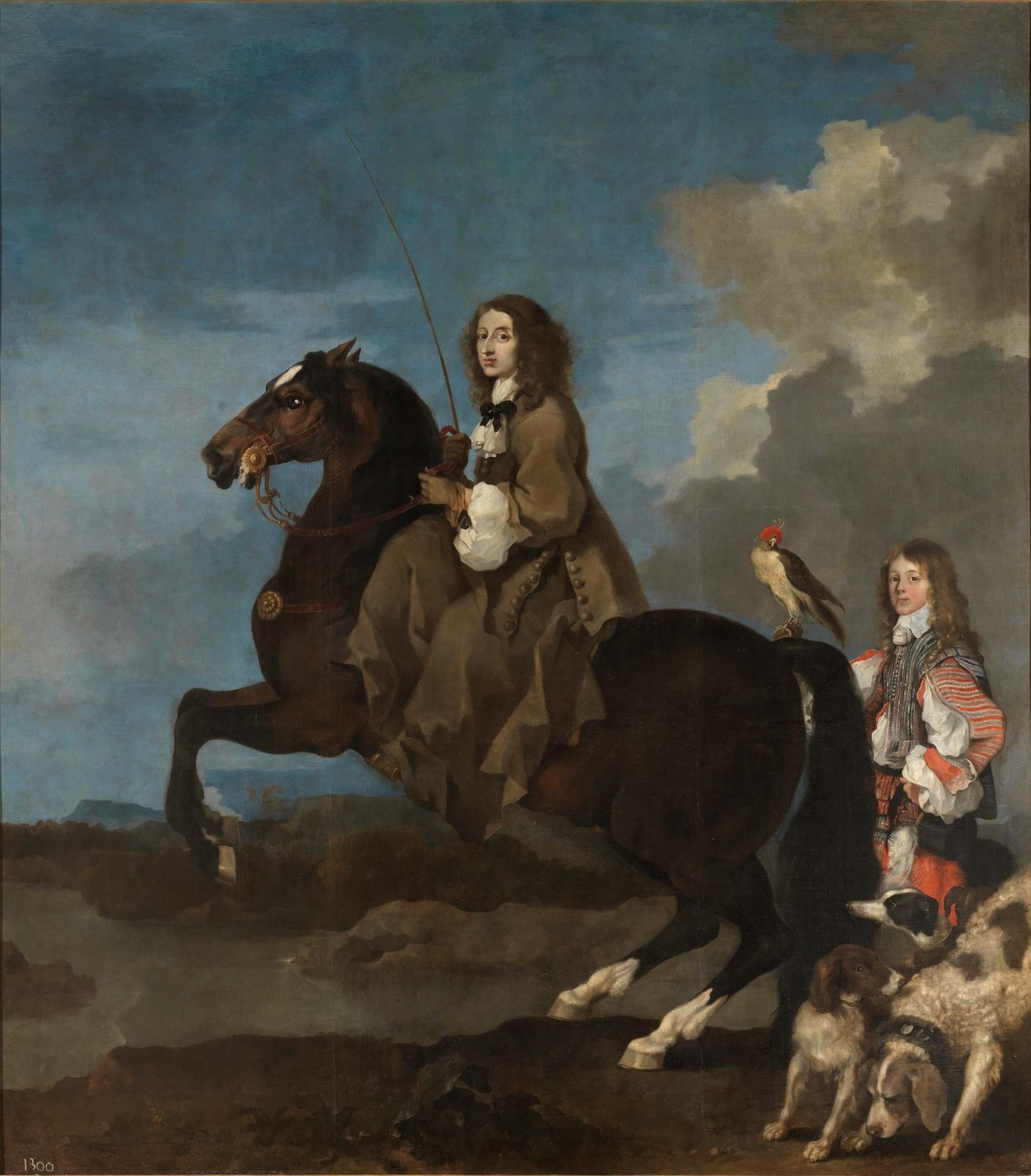
Sébastien Bourdon, Christina of Sweden, 1653, Museo del Prado.

Antonio Pimentel de Prado y lo Bianco (Palermo, 1604 - Antwerp (c. 1671-72) was a Spanish officer, a governor of Nieuwpoort (1646–1651), ambassador in Stockholm (1652–1654), Knight of the Order of Santiago (1658), representative in Paris (1659), governor of Cadiz (1660–1670), and at the end of his life counsel and chief of the army in Antwerp (1670–1672).

== Life ==
About his youth is not much known. His father Lorenzo Pimentel de Prado served at the court of the Duke of Bivona in Palermo and had three sons: Juan, Antonio and Gregorio. His nephew Bernardino de Rebolledo appointed Antonio Pimentel del Prado as the Spanish ambassador in Sweden. This was the first Spanish mission to Sweden since the reign of John III of Sweden.

Christina of Sweden, began negotiations with Philip IV of Spain in 1651 and had the Swedish diplomat Matthias Palbitzki sent to the Spanish court. Philip IV, who was looking for good relations, had ordered the Spanish diplomacy to promote Swedish interests anywhere in Europe. The official aim of the embassy in Stockholm was to investigate the military power of Sweden, but the main task was to find out whether the queen had wedding plans, because the balance of power in Europe would be severely affected if Christina married someone hostile to the power of Spain.

Antonio Pimentel arrived in Dalarö on August 12, 1652, along with his wife, children and an entourage of 50 people, to appear in Stockholm on 16 August, and on 19 August he was received by the queen. The gallant Pimentel quickly became her confidant. He tried to obtain support for her proposal to abdicate. Christina and Pimentel began secret negotiations, often conducted in her library, which gave rise to rumors. She gave him an insight into her plans for the future after abdication.

== Departure ==
Pimentel departed after asking for a large portrait of the Queen as a gift to the King of Spain. This painting by Sebastien Bourdon was finished in June 1653 and now hangs in the Prado. Before Pimentel's departure in early August, the Queen appointed him a knight of the Order of Amarante, whose members vowed never to marry or re-marry (the order was dissolved in 1654). When he left Gothenburg, his ship leaked and he was forced to return. Pimentel went with the queen to Östergötland and followed her to Stockholm. In June 1654, when there was nothing to stand in the way of her conversion, Christina abdicated. She left her country for the Spanish Netherlands to embrace the Catholic faith. Christina continued her friendship with Pimentel, partly because she wanted to mediate between France and Spain who were involved in the Franco-Spanish War (1635-1659).

Pimentel and Christina met again in Brussels in 1655, and he was present when she converted on Christmas Eve of that year. Then he was part of her entourage to Innsbruck and Rome. He left her in 1656 when she made overtures to France. Pimentel later served as a diplomat in Paris and, on behalf of Spain, prepared the Peace of the Pyrenees (October 1659).

== Movie portrayal in Queen Christina ==
In the highly fictionalized 1933 movie Queen Christina, starring Greta Garbo, Pimentel (usually called Antonio or simply "the Spanish envoy") was played by John Gilbert at the insistence of Garbo, his real-life ex-lover. In the movie the queen, dressed like a man, is slumming anonymously around the winter countryside on horseback and teases Antonio and his small retinue (not including wife and children) for getting his coach stuck in a deep, snow-covered rut in the road. She is taken for a young man and given a 1-thaler tip for providing a solution to the Spaniards' dilemma. She rides on and takes the finest room at the inn she'd recommended to him. Antonio later arrives and insists on the finest room for himself. They work out a bed-sharing compromise, since Christina is still mistaken for a man. Partial disrobing eventually reveals her secret, and Antonio becomes her first truly "soul-freeing" lover. She doesn't tell him she is Christina the Queen, but assures him he will see her soon in Stockholm.

When Pimentel arrives at the Swedish court as Spanish envoy, he is astonished to behold Christina as queen. Their professions of love continue in private. Christina is grateful for being shown what true love and a somewhat normal life could be like in the future. The film does not deal with the true queen's struggle with her faith, nor does it mention Pimentel's family. Right after Christina's 1654 abdication, the movie has Antonio felled in a sword duel and dying in her arms. In actuality, Pimentel had dealings with the ex-queen for a couple more years, and he continued to serve Spain until the early 1670s.
