= Gorłówko =

- Village
- Location within Poland
- Coordinates: 53°58′N 22°13′E
- Country: Poland
- Voivodeship: Warmian-Masurian
- County: Ełk
- Gmina: Stare Juchy

Gorłówko [ɡɔrˈwufkɔ] is a village in the administrative district of Gmina Stare Juchy, within Ełk County, Warmian-Masurian Voivodeship, in northern Poland.
