= Kałtki =

- Village
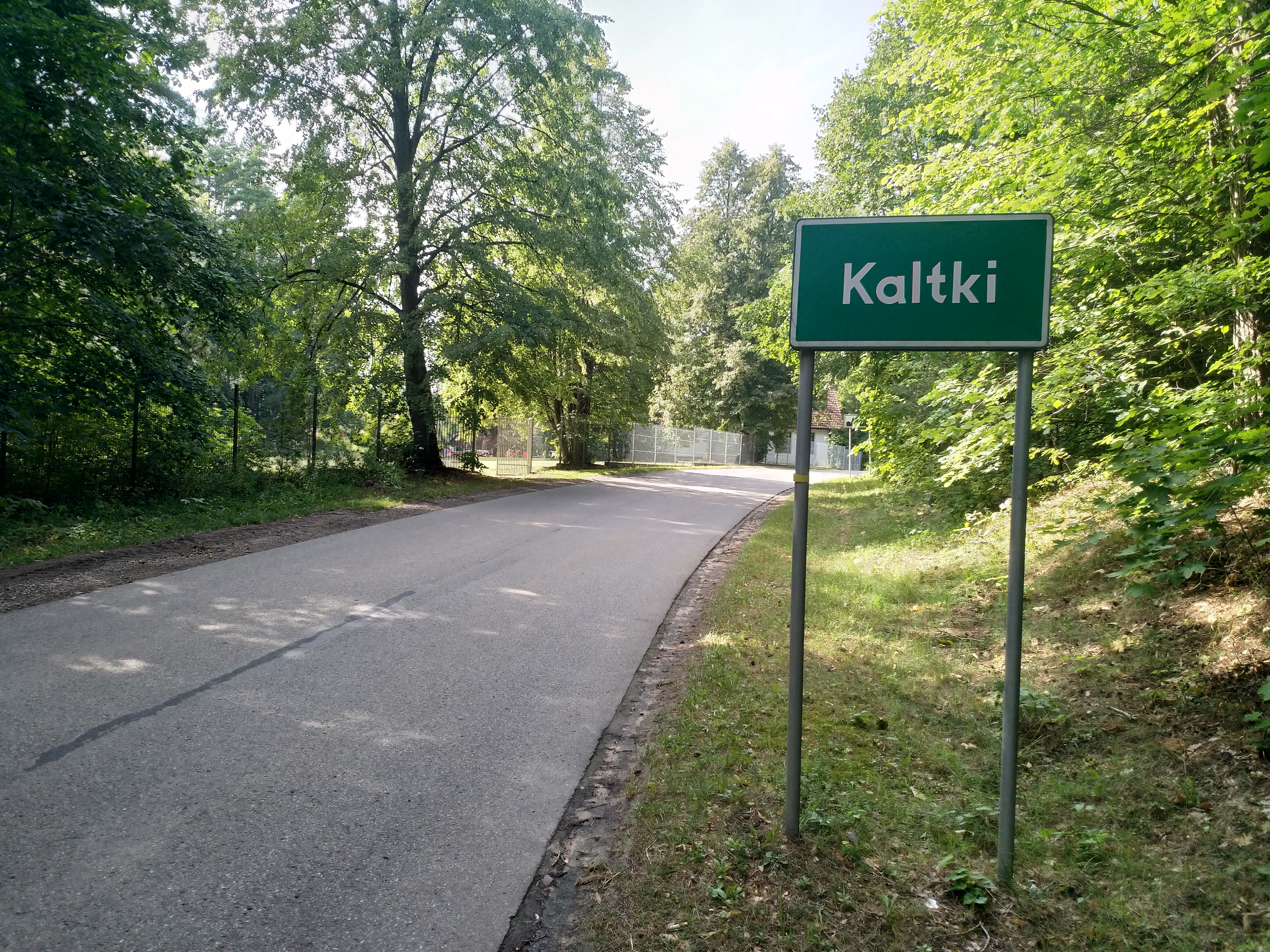
- Kałtki (2024)

- Location within Poland
- Coordinates: 53°56′N 22°9′E
- Country: Poland
- Voivodeship: Warmian-Masurian
- County: Ełk
- Gmina: Stare Juchy

Kałtki [ˈkau̯tki] is a village in the administrative district of Gmina Stare Juchy, within Ełk County, Warmian-Masurian Voivodeship, in northern Poland.
