= Dobra Wola, Warmian-Masurian Voivodeship =

Dobra Wola
- Village
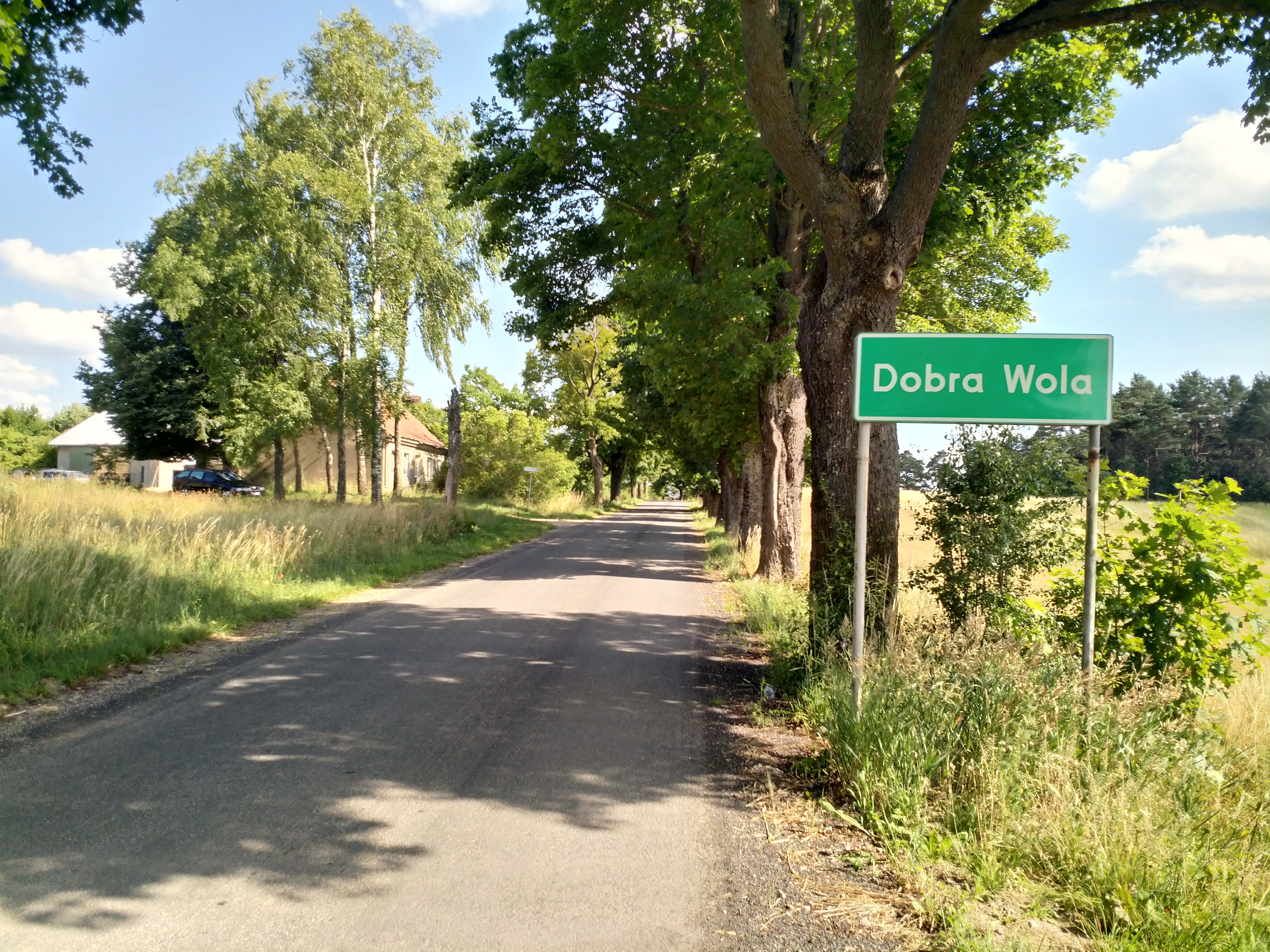

- Location within Poland
- Coordinates: 54°0′N 22°10′E
- Country: Poland
- Voivodeship: Warmian-Masurian
- County: Ełk
- Gmina: Stare Juchy

Dobra Wola [ˈdɔbra ˈvɔla] is a village in the administrative district of Gmina Stare Juchy, within Ełk County, Warmian-Masurian Voivodeship, in northern Poland.
