= On Dangerous Paths =

1915 silent film

- Directed by: John H. Collins
- Written by: Charles Sumner Williams
- Starring: Viola Dana; Helen Strickland; Pat O'Malley
- Production company: Edison Pictures
- Distributed by: General Film Company
- Release date: July 23, 1915
- Running time: 50 minutes
- Country: United States
- Languages: Silent; English intertitles

On Dangerous Paths is a 1915 American silent drama film directed by John H. Collins and starring Viola Dana, Helen Strickland and Pat O'Malley.

== Cast ==
- Viola Dana as Eleanor Thurston
- Helen Strickland as Mrs. Thurston
- William West as Mr. Thurston
- Pat O'Malley as Roger Sterritt
- Mrs. William West as Mr. Thurston's Mother
- Robert Conness as Dr. Sinclair
- Margaret Prussing as Joan Thurston
- Johnnie Walker as Henry Mills
- Grace Williams as Miss Montgomery

== Bibliography ==
- Langman, Larry. American Film Cycles: The Silent Era. Greenwood Publishing, 1998.
