= Bernardino de Rebolledo =

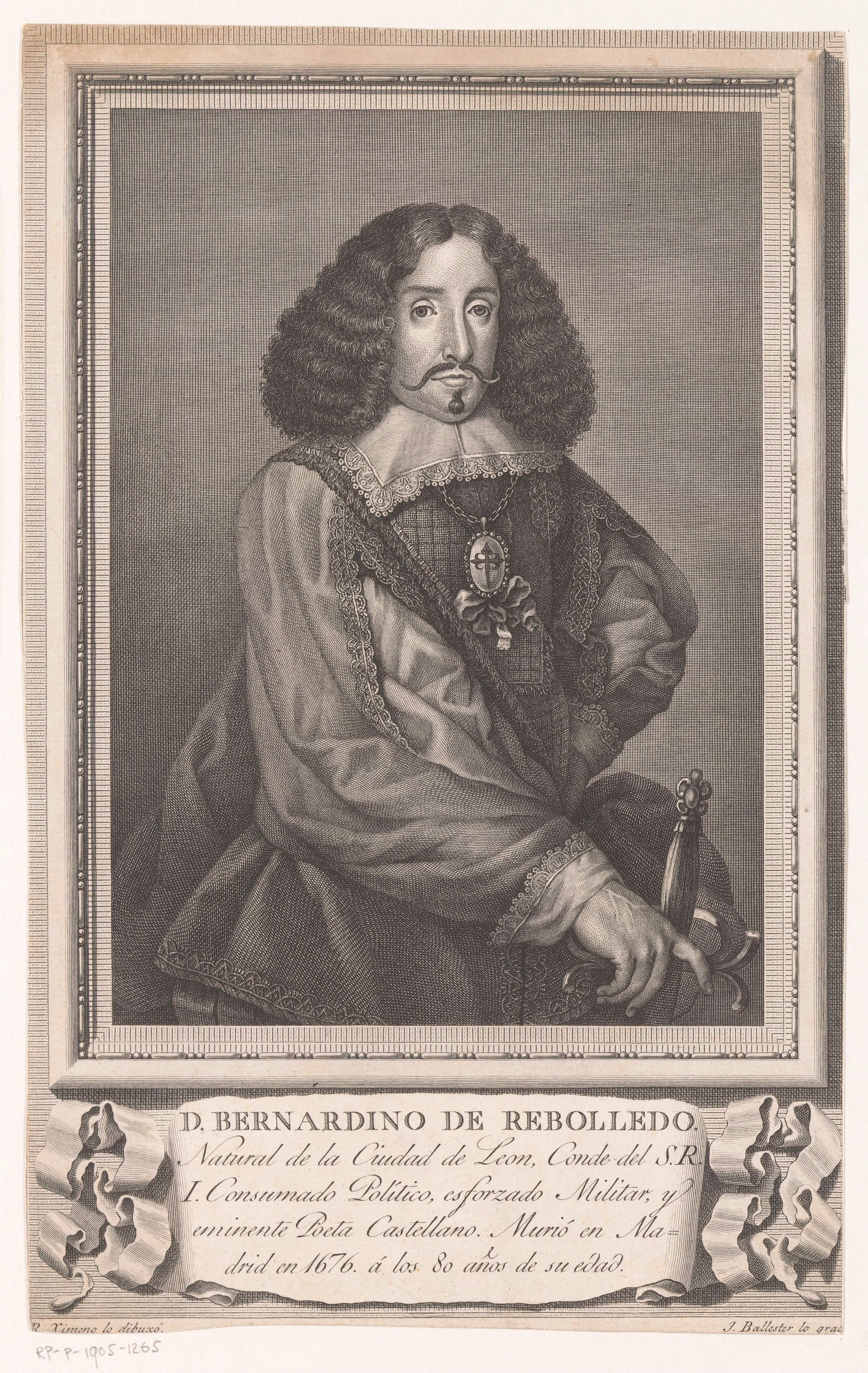
Bernardino de Rebolledo

Bernardino de Rebolledo y Villamizar, Earl of Rebolledo and Graf (Count) of the Holy Roman Empire was a Spanish poet, soldier and diplomat (León, baptized May 31, 1597 – Madrid, March 27, 1676). He was a descendant of the 1st Count of Rebolledo, don Rodrigo, who received his surname and title from the king of Asturias and León don Ramiro I in 815 during the Reconquista.

== Biography ==
A distinguished soldier, he fought in Italy, the Mediterranean and Flanders. Besides his military commitments, he was a diplomat (he served as ambassador in Denmark from 1648 to 1661). Fighting for the Habsburg side, Rebolledo played a prominent role in the Thirty Years War.

During the Thirty Years War, Rebolledo was commander in chief for a Spanish army division and defeated the Swedish army at Frankenthal. Holy Roman Emperor Ferdinand III appointed him Governor of Westphalia and gave him the German noble title Gref av Westphalia länder. De Rebolledo was one of Spanish negotiators of Westphalian Peace Treaty, 1643-48. In 1647 he was appointed Spanish ambassador for Northeastern Europe, Denmark and Poland, with responsibility to keep an eye on Sweden. Pope Pius IV appointed him as his secret representative for Northern Europe with the mission to reconstruct the Catholic Church in Denmark and Sweden, which he did it. He became close friend with members of Denmark royal house who invited him to live in one of the royal family castles. He converted duke af Luneborg to Catholicism. The Danish crown honored him with several portraits, now in Danish national museum and at castles. During the Seven Years Scandinavian war, he served as artillery commander at Danish army. Rebolledo received from Denmark the mission to negotiate with Sweden a Peace treaty to finish the war. He appointed his nephew Antonio Pimentel de Prado as Spanish ambassador to Sweden, who succeeded to build up a confident relation with Queen Christina of Sweden, who did not want to marry, but wanted to abdicate and become a catholic. Christina was the granddaughter of Gustav Vasa, the same who started Lutheran reform against the Catholic Church in Sweden and part of Denmark. Pimentel and others aimed to convert the Swedish Queen Christina, who created in his honour the Amarant Order, a cultural organization still existing. Rebolledo succeeded, helping her to escape from Stockholm in a man disguise to Lübeck, were his Jewish-Spanish friend Moshe Texeira succeeded hiding Christina.

As a poet, he shows a personal tone, due to his military and diplomatic obligations, out of Spain and its literary tendencies.

== Descendants from Count house de Rebolledo ==
- From English-Chilean lineage, Chilean navy admiral Juan Williams Rebolledo, son of English Royal navy commander John Williams Wilson and Spanish-Chilean Micaela de Rebolledo.
- From Norway lineage poet & writer Torgeir Rebolledo Pedersen.

From Spain-Chile writer and professor Carlos Medina de Rebolledo.

== Selected works ==
His main poetical work, Ocios, is a large compilation of his poetry.

=== Ancient editions ===
- Antwerpen (Antwerp), Officina Plantiniana, 1650.
- Antwerpen (Antwerp), Officina Plantiniana, 1660.
- Madrid, Antonio de Sancha, 1778.

=== Modern edition ===
- Edición crítica de los Ocios del Conde de Rebolledo, por Rafael González Cañal, Cuenca: Universidad de Castilla-La Mancha, 1997. ISBN 978-84-89492-53-0.

He wrote, too, Selvas dánicas, (Copenhagen, Pedro Morsingio, 1655), a poetical genealogy of the Royal House of Denmark, and dedicated to Queen Sophie Amalie of Brunswick-Lüneburg; Selva militar y política, (Cologne, Antonio Kinchio, 1652), dedicated to King of the Romans Ferdinand IV of Germany; La constancia victoriosa, égloga sacra, (Cologne, Antonio Kinchio, 1655), which is a translation of the Book of Job, and is dedicated to Queen Christina of Sweden, etc.
