= Czerwonka, Ełk County =

Czerwonka
- Village
- Location within Poland
- Coordinates: 53°53′N 22°14′E
- Country: Poland
- Voivodeship: Warmian-Masurian
- County: Ełk
- Gmina: Stare Juchy

Czerwonka ([t͡ʂɛrˈvɔnka]; German: Rotbach) is a village in the administrative district of Gmina Stare Juchy, within Ełk County, Warmian-Masurian Voivodeship, in northern Poland.
