= Queen Christina (film) =

1933 film by Rouben Mamoulian

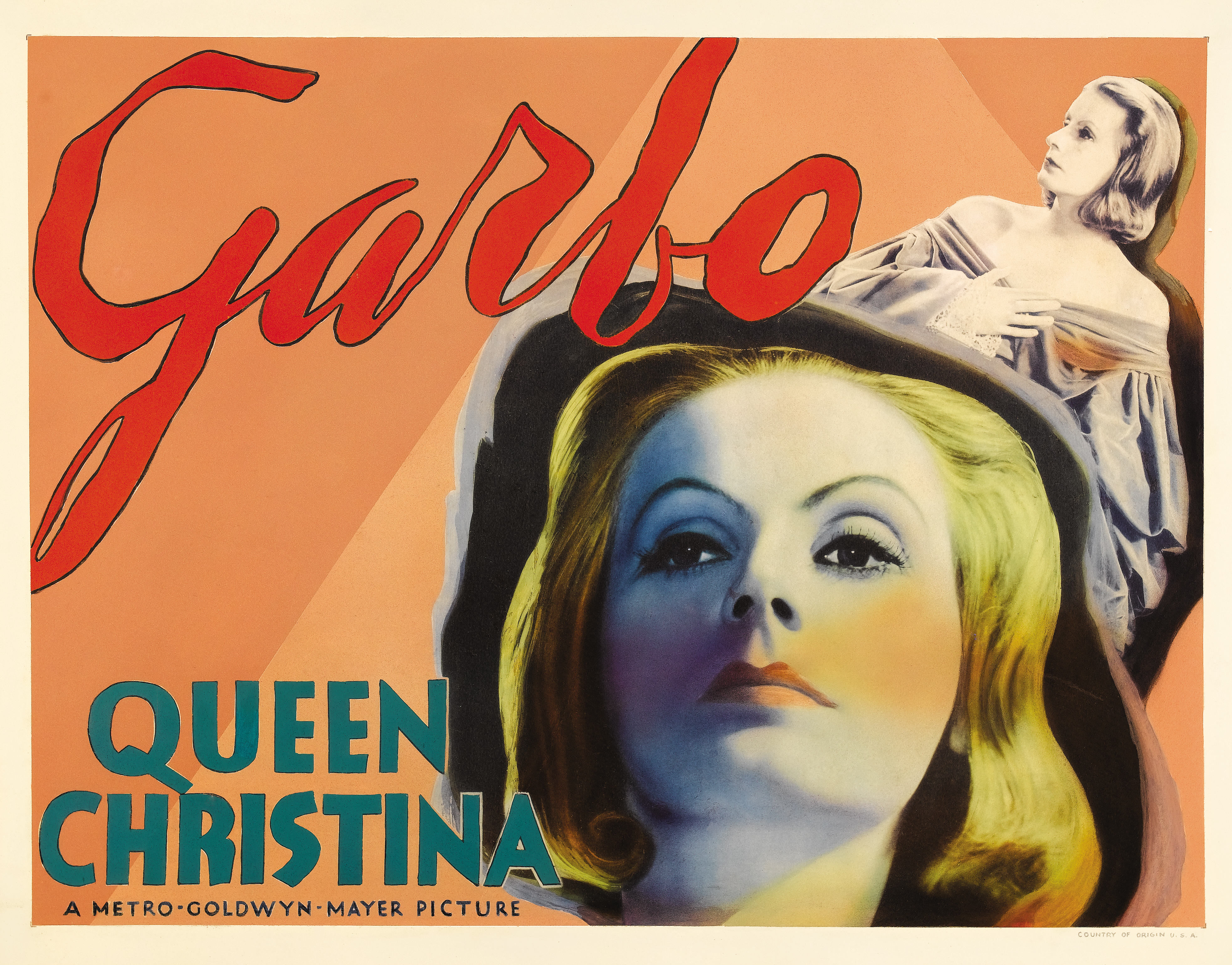
- Lobby card
- Directed by: Rouben Mamoulian
- Written by: S. N. Behrman (dialogue)
- Screenplay by: H. M. Harwood; Salka Viertel
- Story by: Salka Viertel; Margaret P. Levino
- Produced by: Walter Wanger
- Starring: Greta Garbo; John Gilbert
- Cinematography: William H. Daniels
- Edited by: Blanche Sewell
- Music by: Herbert Stothart
- Production company: Metro-Goldwyn-Mayer
- Distributed by: Loew's, Inc.
- Release date: December 26, 1933
- Running time: 99 minutes
- Country: United States
- Language: English
- Budget: $1,114,000
- Box office: $2,887,285

Queen Christina is a pre-Code Hollywood biographical film, produced for Metro-Goldwyn-Mayer in 1933 by Walter Wanger and directed by Rouben Mamoulian. It stars Swedish-born actress Greta Garbo and John Gilbert in their fourth and last film together.

The film was a major commercial and critical success in the United States and worldwide.

== Plot ==
Queen Christina of Sweden is devoted to her country and the welfare of her people. As queen, she favors peace for Sweden and argues convincingly for an end to the Thirty Years' War, saying:

Spoils, glory, flags and trumpets! What is behind these high-sounding words? Death and destruction, triumphals of crippled men, Sweden victorious in a ravaged Europe, an island in a dead sea. I tell you, I want no more of it. I want for my people security and happiness. I want to cultivate the arts of peace, the arts of life. I want peace and peace I will have!

Christina, who first took the throne at age six upon the death of her father in battle, is depicted as being so devoted to both governing well and educating herself that she has spurned any kind of serious romance or marriage, despite pressure from her councilors and court to marry her heroic cousin Karl Gustav and produce an heir. One day, in an effort to escape the restrictions of her royal life, she sneaks out of town and ends up at the same inn as Antonio, a Spanish envoy on his way to the capital. The two talk and become friends, though Antonio thinks Christina is a man because of the way she is dressed. When the innkeeper, who is also unaware of Christina's identity, asks if she will let Antonio share her bed because there is no room available for him, Christina is unable to come up with a suitable reason to deny the request. In her room, she reveals to Antonio that she is a woman, but not that she is a queen, and they spend the night together. Their tryst is extended by a few days when they become snowbound at the inn.

When the time comes for Christina and Antonio to part, Christina assures Antonio that they will reunite in Stockholm. To his surprise, this occurs when the Spaniard is presented to the Queen, whom he recognizes as his lover. Antonio is initially somewhat hurt and annoyed because he thinks Christina has played a trick on him and compromised his loyalty to the King of Spain, who sent Antonio on this mission to Sweden to present Christina with an offer of marriage on his behalf. She makes it clear that her feelings for Antonio are genuine and that she regularly receives such offers from foreign royalty and has no intention of accepting the King's proposal, and she and Antonio patch things up.

When the scheming Count Magnus, who had previously had some romantic liaisons with the Queen, rouses the people against the Spaniard, Christina is able to ease tensions for a time, but ultimately, she decides to name Karl Gustav as her successor and, in a move that shocks the entire court, abdicates the throne to be with Antonio. When she gets to the boat that is to take Antonio and her to Spain, she finds him gravely wounded from a sword duel with Magnus, which he lost. Antonio dies in her arms, but Christina resolves to proceed with the voyage. She envisions residing in the home Antonio described to her as sitting on white cliffs overlooking the sea.

== Cast ==
- Greta Garbo as Christina, Queen of Sweden
- John Gilbert as Antonio Pimentel de Prado
- Ian Keith as Count Magnus Gabriel De la Gardie
- Lewis Stone as Axel Oxenstierna
- Elizabeth Young as Countess Ebba Sparre
- C. Aubrey Smith as Aage
- Reginald Owen as Charles X Gustav of Sweden
- Georges Renavent as Chanut, the French Ambassador
- David Torrence as Archbishop
- Gustav von Seyffertitz as General
- Ferdinand Munier as Innkeeper

Uncredited cast members

- Cora Sue Collins as Christina as a Child
- C. Montague Shaw as King Gustavus Adolphus of Sweden
- Akim Tamiroff as Pedro
- Barbara Barondess as Elsa
- Tiny Sandford as Cook at the Inn
- Bodil Rosing as Innkeeper's Wife
- Muriel Evans as Barmaid at the Inn
- Edward Gargan as Drinker Betting on 9
- Paul Hurst as Swedish Soldier Betting on 6
- Hooper Atchley as Antonio's Companion in Coach
- James Burke as Blacksmith Rabble Rouser
- Wade Boteler as Magnus' Rabble Rouser
- Gladden James as Rabble Rouser
- Richard Alexander as Peasant
- Edward Norris as Count Jacob
- Carrie Daumery as Woman at Court
- Fred Kohler as Member of Court

== Production ==
The film was released in December 1933, directed by Rouben Mamoulian and written by H. M. Harwood and Salka Viertel, with dialogue by S. N. Behrman, based on a story by Viertel and Margaret P. Levino. The leading roles are played by Greta Garbo as Christina and John Gilbert as Don Antonio, an emissary from Spain.

As early as 1928, MGM was examining sources to develop a scenario suitable for studio property Greta Garbo in the role of 17th century Swedish queen, Christina. Mamoulian’s enlistment as director for the film came late in its pre-production development. Though Garbo influenced the choice, Mamoulian’s selection may have had less to do with her and more to do with MGM producer Walter Wanger, formally with New York the Theatre Guild, who had gotten Mamoulian his first job in both New York and Hollywood.

As to the supporting cast, British actor Laurence Olivier was to have made his America movie debut as the Spaniard Antonio, but his screen test was unimpressive, and he failed to form a genuine rapport with Garbo. The role went to John Gilbert, who had a long and mutually supportive professional and personal relationship with Garbo.

Garbo herself insisted on having Gilbert as her co-star.

== Critically acclaimed sequences ==
Two scenes from Queen Christina have been widely and favorably commented upon by both contemporary and subsequent film critics.

=== The bedroom sequence ===
“I have been memorizing this room. In the future, in my memory, I shall live a great deal in this room.” —Greta Garbo as Queen Christina, leaving the suite in which she has discovered true love with Antonio (John Gilbert).

After her brief but personally transformative sexual encounter with the Spanish ambassador Antonio Pimentel de Prado (John Gilbert), Queen Christina lingers in the room in which they have had intercourse, committing the room’s interior to memory as though its components “had shared some secret with her.”

Director Rouben Mamoulian described the sequence as “a sonnet”, informing Garbo before shooting “this has to be sheer poetry and feeling. The moment must be like a dance. Treat it as you would do it to music.”

=== Final scene on the bow of the ship ===
“It is surely no accident that in the film’s two most celebrated sequences—perhaps two of the most fondly remembered scenes in her entire career —Garbo appears entirely alone.” —Film historian Tom Milne in Rouben Mamoulian (1969).

As Queen Christina prepares to sail to Spain as the betrothed to the King of Spain, she stands, like a living Figure-head as she faces her future and fate.

The scene is notable as a characterization establishing Greta Garbo’s mystique as a screen star and as a cultural icon. Director Mamoulian recalled his exchange with Garbo on preparing the shot:

Garbo: “What do I play in this scene?”
Mamoulian: “Have you heard of tabula rasa? I want your face to be a blank piece of paper. I want the writing to be done by every member of the audience. I would like it if you could avoid even blinking your eyes, so that you’re nothing but a beautiful mask.”

Film historian Tom Milne remarked that “inevitably, Queen Christina has come to be remembered as a two-sequence film”, in what is otherwise an overall competently executed picture.

== Critical reception and box office ==
The film premiered in New York City on December 26, 1933, and opened in the rest of the world throughout 1934. It was nominated for the Mussolini Cup award at the Venice Film Festival in 1934, but lost to Man of Aran.

Queen Christina turned out to be a success with the critics, gathering many positive reviews. Critic Mordaunt Hall, writing for The New York Times, gave the film a positive review and liked the screenplay, calling the dialogue "a bright and smooth piece of writing" and referred to Mamoulian's direction as "entrancing". Positive opinions came also from Modern Screen's Walter Ramsey, who proclaimed it a "triumph for Garbo", and a reviewer for Photoplay, who acclaimed Garbo's "glorious reappearance".

Motion Picture Daily called the film "creaky in spots", but reported that Garbo "does beautifully" and that the film was "well above the average in content and value." The New York Daily News wrote: "The picture moves a little slowly, but with grace, from one lovely setting to another. It is a picture that must not be missed, because Garbo is at her best in some of its scenes."

Some reviews were mixed. "Garbo overwhelms the picture", wrote John Mosher in The New Yorker. "The story, the setting, her support cannot live up to her." Variety found the film "slow and ofttimes stilted", though it wrote that Garbo's "regal impression is convincing, which counts for plenty." The Sun of New York wrote that "Garbo seems to be suffering from an acute case of glamour. And that is probably not her fault. Gilbert tried very hard, but his performance is a little stilted. Queen Christina misses fire, somehow, and that is disappointing."

According to the AFI Catalog, despite the critical acclaim, the film did not do well at the American box office. TCM's Frank Miller stated: "It would be years before foreign revenues and reissues brought the film into the profit column." In 1994, Barry Paris wrote that final tally was: "Cost: $1,144,000. Earnings: domestic $767,000; foreign $1,843,000; total $2,610,000. Profit: $632,000".

As of June 2020, the movie currently had a 90% "Fresh" rating at Rotten Tomatoes, based on 21 reviews. Leonard Maltin gave the film 4 out of 4 stars, calling it "Probably Garbo's best film, with a haunting performance by the radiant star as 17th-century Swedish queen who relinquishes her throne for her lover, Gilbert. Garbo and Gilbert's love scenes together are truly memorable, as is the famous final shot...”

The part of Queen Christina is regarded as one of the better in Garbo's filmography, and the film is especially notable for resoundingly disproving rumors that John Gilbert's lack of success in the sound era was due to his having an unsuitable voice.

== Historical accuracy ==
The film is a historical costume drama based loosely on the life of 17th-century Queen Christina of Sweden, and still more loosely on August Strindberg's history play Kristina. A number of historical characters appear in the film (such as Axel Oxenstierna, Charles X Gustav of Sweden, and Magnus Gabriel De la Gardie), and some historical events are depicted (such as the Thirty Years' War and Christina's abdication), but Queen Christina is not a film that adheres closely to the facts. In this highly fictionalized account, it is falling in love that brings Christina into conflict with the political realities of her society, whereas, in real life, Christina's main reasons for abdication were her determination not to marry, to live as she pleased, and to openly convert to Catholicism.

The romance with Antonio is fiction and can be seen as a typical "Hollywood" distortion of history—unless it is understood as an allegory, with her love for Don Antonio representing her love of the intellectual life and her embrace of the Catholic faith. In reality, Christina was devoted to her maid of honor, friend, and "bedfellow" Ebba Sparre. In the film, Christina kisses Ebba twice, but the kisses are quite chaste, and any suggestion of a romantic relationship between the two women is firmly blocked by a scene in which Christina comes upon Ebba and Count Jakob meeting on a staircase and immediately leaves for what will be her encounter with Antonio. When Christina returns, she apologizes to Ebba and promises she may marry her beloved Count. The real Ebba did marry Count Jakob, but the marriage was an unhappy one.

The film is correct in stating that Christina's father had her raised as if she were a boy, with the education and responsibilities expected of a male heir, and in depicting her habit of dressing as a man, which continued throughout her life. The historical Christina was, also, indeed adamant about making peace, and was a patron of science, art, and culture, dreaming of making Stockholm the "Athens of the North".

Greta Garbo was troubled by the films’ historical inaccuracies and absurdities: “Just imagine Christina abdicating for the sake of a little Spaniard” she wrote a friend. She dreaded reaction to the picture from fellow Swedes.
