= Rogalik =

- Village
- Location within Poland
- Coordinates: 53°49′44″N 22°09′06″E
- Country: Poland
- Voivodeship: Warmian-Masurian
- County: Ełk
- Gmina: Stare Juchy
- Time zone: UTC+1 (CET)
  - Summer (DST): UTC+2 (CEST)
- Vehicle registration: NEL

Rogalik [rɔˈɡalik] is a village in the administrative district of Gmina Stare Juchy, within Ełk County, Warmian-Masurian Voivodeship, in northern Poland. It is located in the region of Masuria.
