= Płowce, Warmian-Masurian Voivodeship =

Płowce
- Village
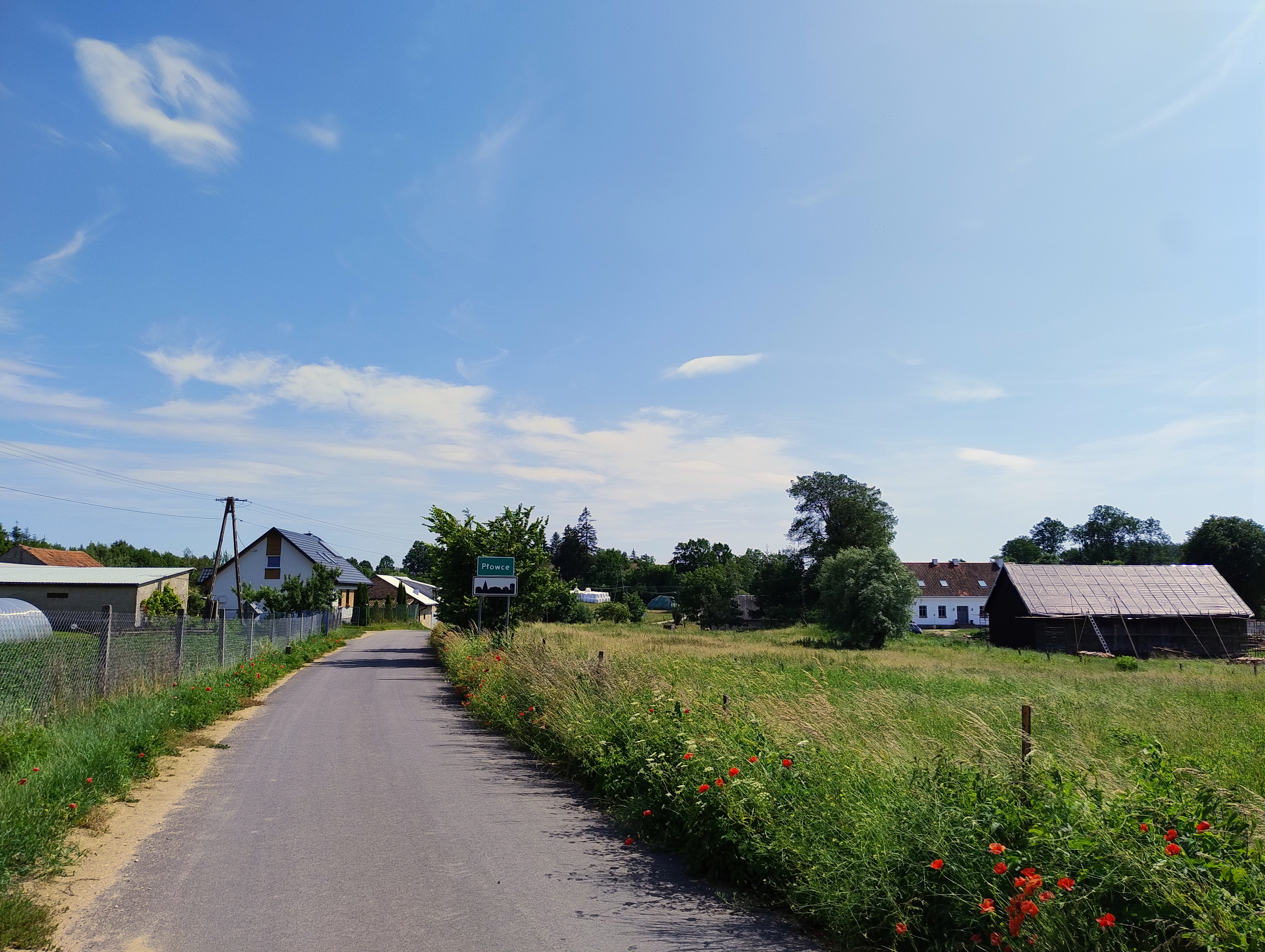
- Płowce (2025)

- Location within Poland
- Coordinates: 53°54′N 22°8′E
- Country: Poland
- Voivodeship: Warmian-Masurian
- County: Ełk
- Gmina: Stare Juchy
- Time zone: UTC+1 (CET)
  - Summer (DST): UTC+2 (CEST)
- Vehicle registration: NEL

Płowce [ˈpwɔft͡sɛ] is a village in the administrative district of Gmina Stare Juchy, within Ełk County, Warmian-Masurian Voivodeship, in northern Poland. It is located in Masuria.
