= Margaret Prussing =

American actress

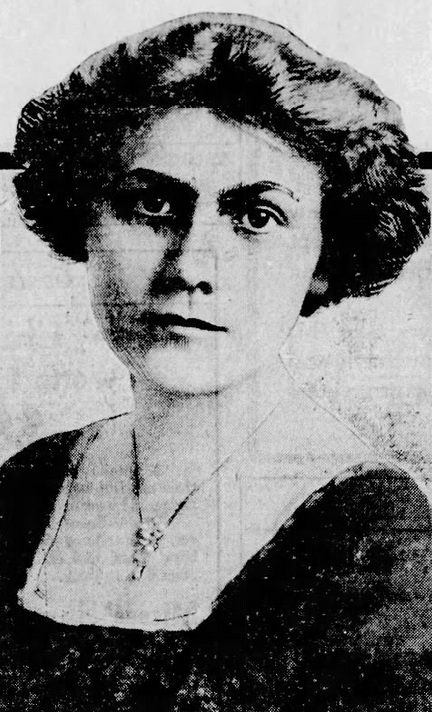
- Margaret Prussing, from a 1912 newspaper
- Born: Margaret Alice Prussing; March 29, 1890; Highland, Illinois, U.S.
- Died: January 13, 1944 (age 53); Los Angeles, California, U.S.
- Other names: Margaret P. Levino
- Occupation(s): Actress, screenwriter
- Father: Eugene Prussing

Margaret Alice Prussing LeVino (March 29, 1890 – January 13, 1944) was an American actress and screenwriter, who was also involved in starting a progressive school in Los Angeles.

== Early life and education ==
Prussing was born in Highland, Illinois, the daughter of Eugene Prussing and Louise Schenck Prussing. Her mother was born in Germany, as were her paternal grandparents. Her father was a lawyer and judge, born in Chicago. She attended the Latin School of Chicago, and graduated from Bryn Mawr College in 1911. At Bryn Mawr she was active in the College Equal Suffrage League, the student government, and college theatricals.

== Career ==
Prussing was a stage actress in Boston, Chicago, and New York City, early in her career. She appeared in more than thirty silent films made between 1912 and 1916. She was considered a good fit for film work because she was "adept at all outdoor sports", able to swim, ride a horse, fly a plane, and drive an automobile.

In 1927, LeVino started The Progressive School of Los Angeles, with psychologist Dorothy Walter Baruch and literary agent Adeline Jaffe Schulberg. The children of John Ford, Victor McLaglen, Hoot Gibson, Harry Rapf, Frances Marion, and other filmmakers were at the school with her children.

== Filmography ==
In addition to four full-length silent films in 1914 and 1915, Prussing appeared in at least 29 short silent films, beginning with The Passing Parade (1912) and ending with The Goad of Jealousy (1916).

- The Mystery of Edwin Drood (1914)
- On Dangerous Paths (1915)
- The Ploughshare (1915)
- The Ring of the Borgias (1915)

Prussing also earned writing credits on films in the 1930s, under the name Margaret P. Levino. She was co-writer of the story for Queen Christina (1933) with Salka Viertel, and she co-adapted the screenplay of Confession (1937) with Julius J. Epstein.

== Personal life ==
Prussing married writer and studio executive Albert (Bert) Shelby LeVino in 1916, in New York. They had two sons, Shelby and Theodore; Shelby died in childhood. The LeVinos socialized with other screenwriters, including Dashiell Hammett, Nunnally Johnson, Lucien Hubbard, Herbert Asbury, and Joel Sayre. She died in 1944, at the age of 53, in Los Angeles.
