= Johann Adam Woldemar Pruss =

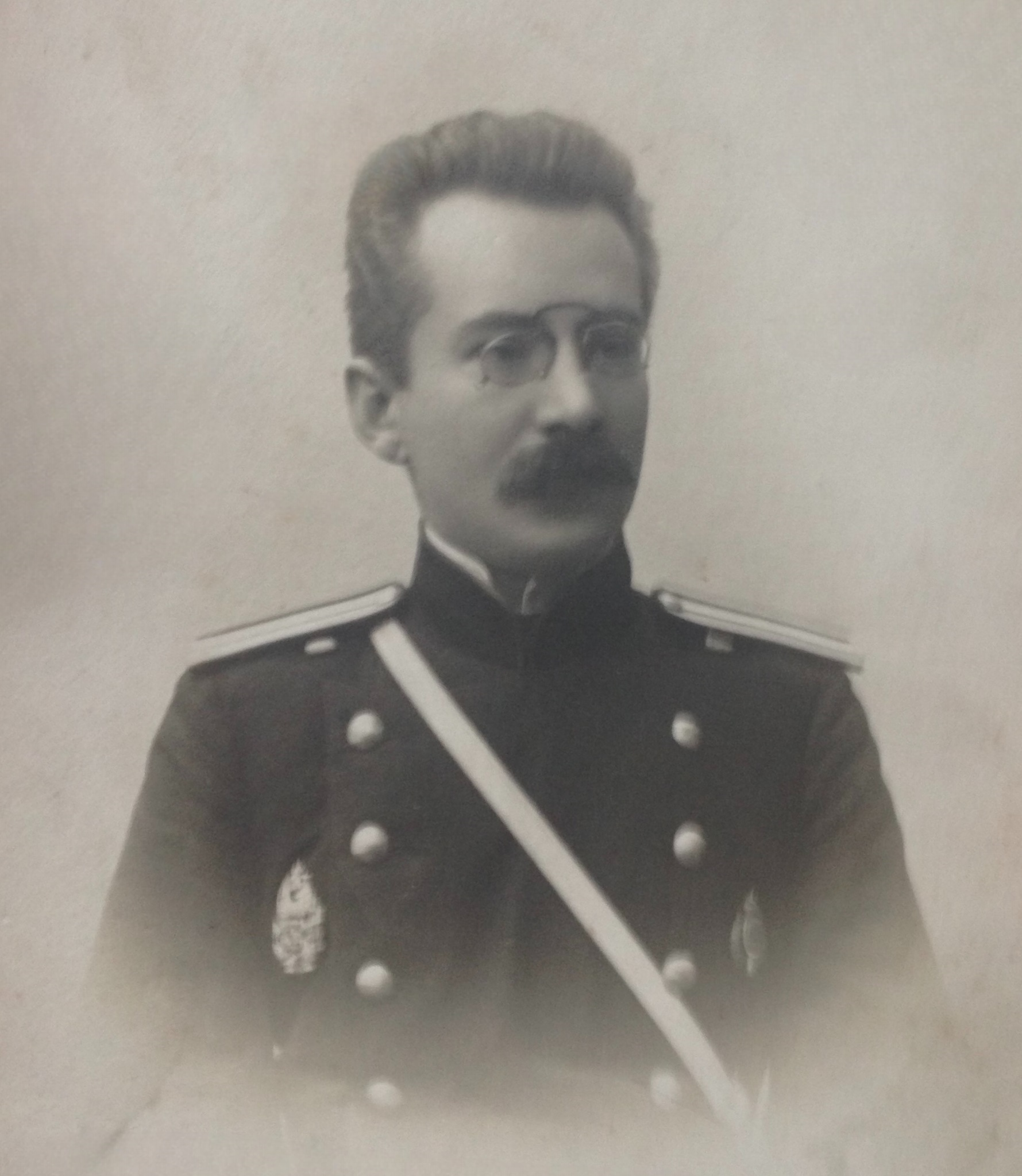
- Born: 9 June 1875; Viciebsk, Russian Empire
- Died: 29 November 1935 (aged 60); Leningrad, Soviet Union
- Occupation: military doctor

Johann Adam Woldemar Pruss (1875–1935) was a Russian military doctor of Latvian and Lithuanian origin. He served in the Grand Duchy of Finland, headed the Helsinki Military Hospital and took part in the Russian Civil War as a member of the White Army.

He was born in a German-speaking Lutheran family of Baltic origin in Viciebsk, Russian Empire. His father, Heinrich Adolph Pruss, was a Prussian Lithuanian from Skomentnen, Lyck District, East Prussia, where his father Carl Pruss worked as a teacher and ran an insurance company. He immigrated to what is now Belarus and worked as a railway station master. Woldemar Pruss's mother Anna Elizabete Priede was Latvian, her father Kārlis Vilhelms Priede was a boatswain in Riga.

Pruss was the oldest of 13 siblings, 8 of whom survived infancy. After graduating from a classical gymnasium in Viciebsk in 1893, he studied at the Imperial Military Medical Academy in Saint Petersburg until 1899. Between the years 1899 and 1904, he served as a military doctor in Płock, Viciebsk and Barysaw. In 1904, he was sent to the Russo-Japanese War and served in Port Arthur.

Shortly after the end of the war, he went to Saint Petersburg, where he met and soon married Charlotte von Morr, daughter of Jacob Morr, a pedagogue of Baltic German and Latvian ancestry who later headed the Tsarskoye Selo Gymnasium.

Between 1906 and 1912, Pruss attained another degree from the Imperial Military Medical Academy and briefly studied in Berlin. In 1913, he published a short book in Russian entitled Sanitary Service in Battle. Shortly afterwards, he was appointed to the First Finnish Infantry Regiment stationed in Turku as its senior military doctor. During World War I, he served in Vyborg and Daugavpils. In 1917, he was appointed chief medical officer of the Helsinki Military Hospital. Between the years 1919 and 1920, he served as an assistant head of the sanitary department of the Northern Army's Murmansk district.

In 1920, he moved to Tallinn, Estonia, where he worked as a civil paramedic and became friends with the Soviet ambassador Leonid Stark. A letter by Stark confirming Pruss's "ideologically correct" views and loyalty, which has been preserved by a Saint Petersburg archive, likely helped him avoid persecution after his return to the USSR in 1923.

He settled in Saint Petersburg, later renamed Leningrad, and taught military medicine. Later, he also worked at the rationalization and optimization departments of a food processing plant and an optical glass factory. He died in 1935 and was buried at the Smolensky Lutheran Cemetery next to the grave of his father-in-law Jacob Morr.

== Family ==
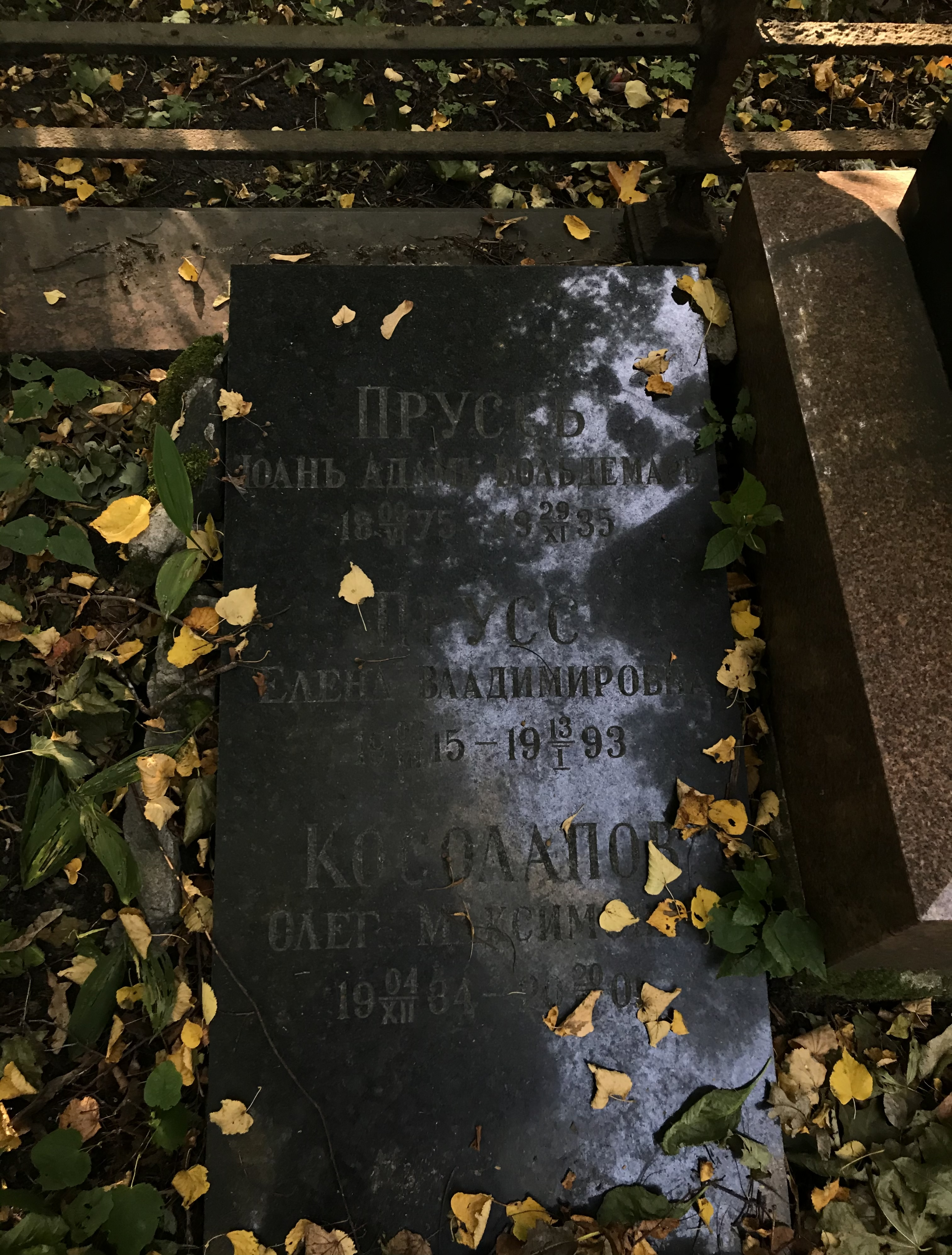
Pruss's grave in Saint Petersburg

Woldemar Pruss and Charlotte von Morr had three children. Their oldest son Vladimir Pruss became a historian and founded the history department at Atyrau University in Kazakhstan. Their second son Nikolai Pruss, a teacher, was arrested by the NKVD as an alleged "anarchist counter-revolutionary" in 1935 and executed in a Gulag camp in Vorkuta during Stalin's Great Purge in 1938. Their youngest daughter Elena died in Saint Petersburg in 1993.

Pruss's brother Teodors was executed the same year as his son Nikolai for allegedly "organizing a group of Latvian nationalist spies" at a sports equipment factory in Moscow.
