= Grabnik, Ełk County =

Grabnik
- Village
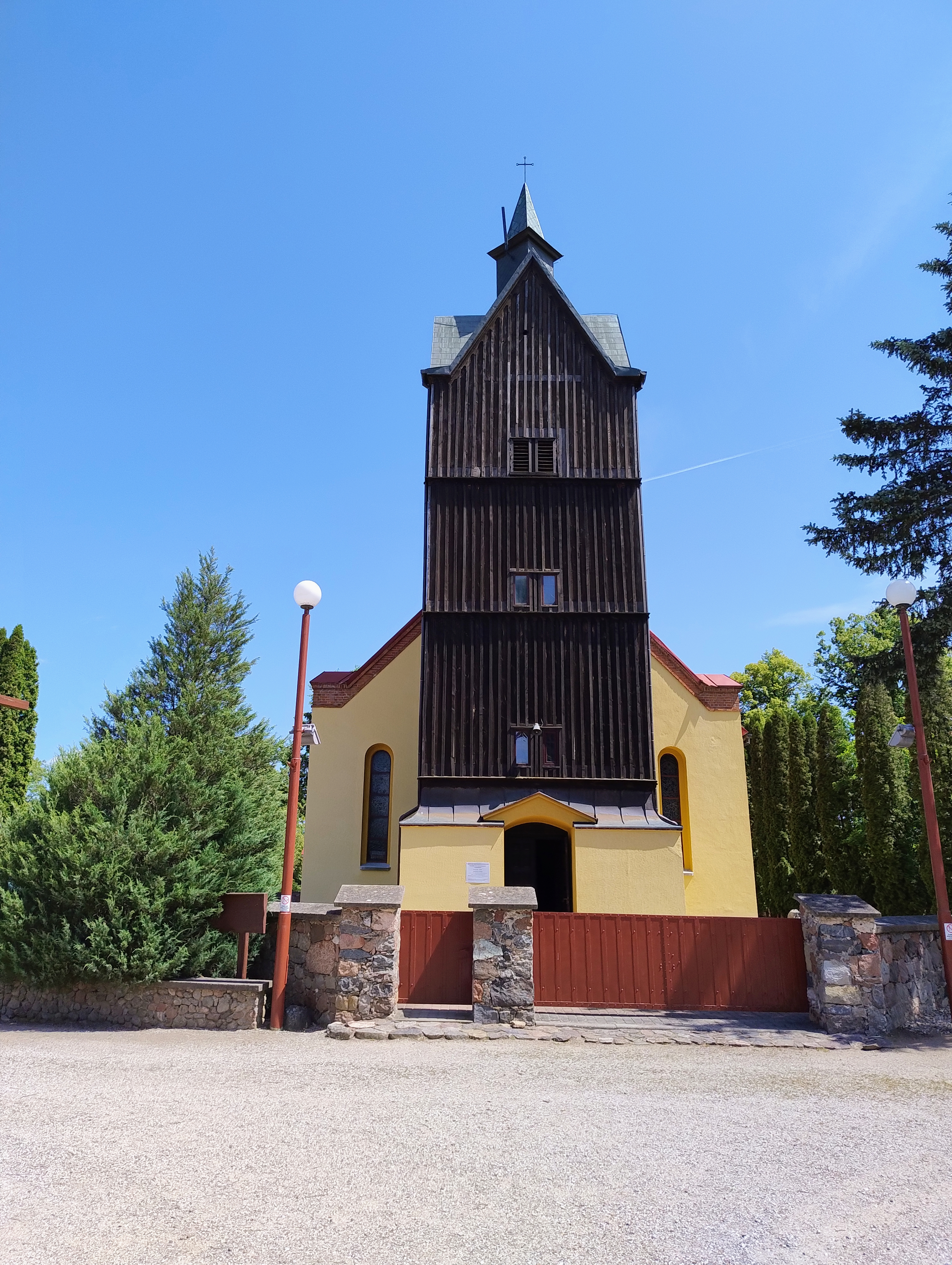
- Grabnik (2025)

- Location within Poland
- Coordinates: 53°52′N 22°12′E
- Country: Poland
- Voivodeship: Warmian-Masurian
- County: Ełk
- Gmina: Stare Juchy

Grabnik [ˈɡrabnik] is a village in the administrative district of Gmina Stare Juchy, within Ełk County, Warmian-Masurian Voivodeship, in northern Poland.
