= Stare Krzywe =

- Village
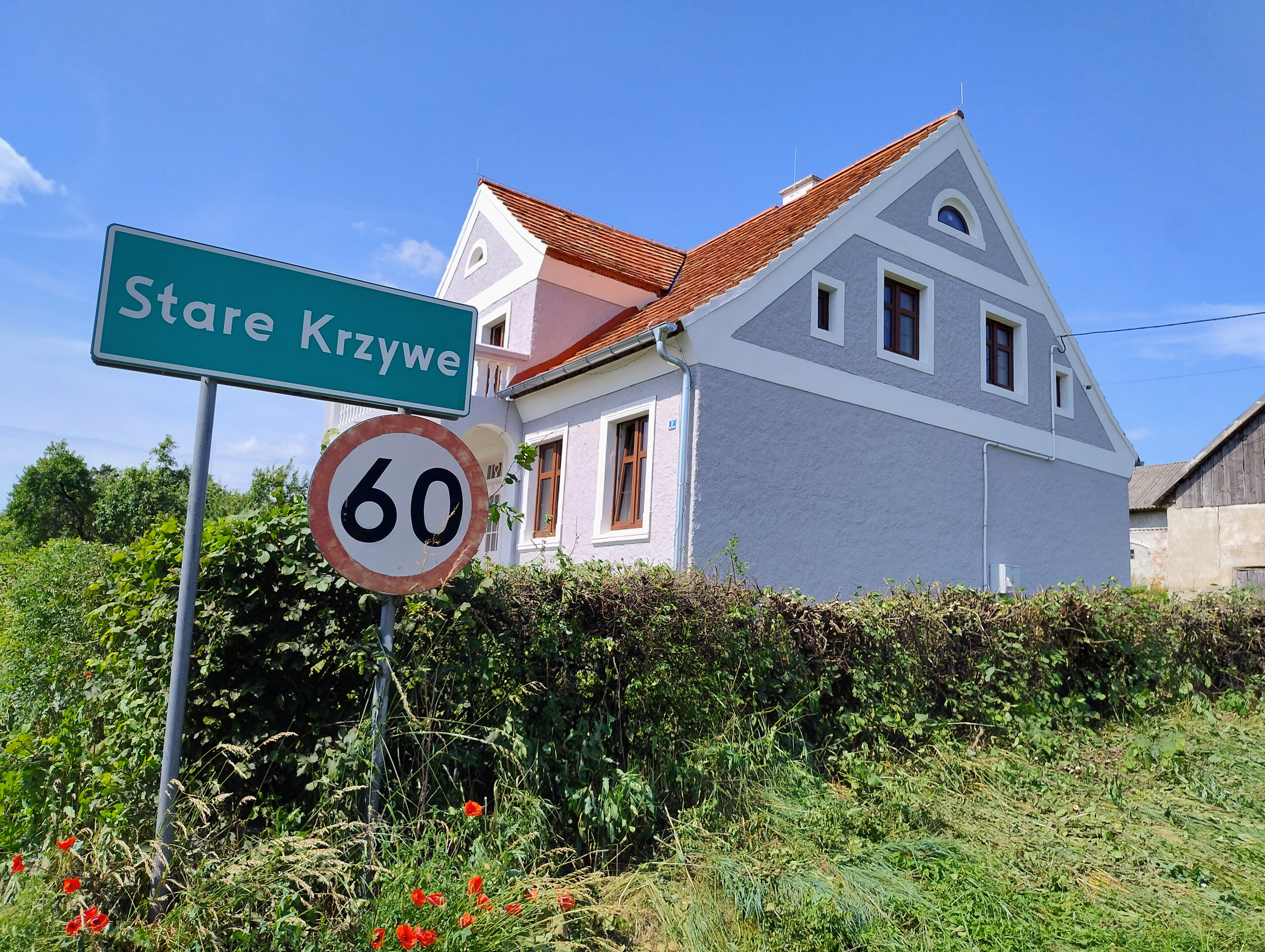
- Stare Krzywe (2025)

- Location within Poland
- Coordinates: 53°54′N 22°7′E
- Country: Poland
- Voivodeship: Warmian-Masurian
- County: Ełk
- Gmina: Stare Juchy

Stare Krzywe [ˈstarɛ ˈkʂɨvɛ] is a village in the administrative district of Gmina Stare Juchy, within Ełk County, Warmian-Masurian Voivodeship, in northern Poland.
