= Eugene Prussing =

American lawyer and philanthropist

Eugene Ernst Prussing (July 12, 1855 – July 12, 1936) was an American entertainment lawyer and philanthropist based in Chicago.

Prussing was born in Chicago to German immigrant parents, Theodor Sophus Ernst Prüssing, from Segeberg, Schleswig Holstein; and Luise Franziska Peltzer, from Aachen. His father was an advocate for abolitionism and the Underground Railroad. Additionally, he served on the Chicago Board of Education and founded several organizations for the betterment of Chicago's German immigrants.

While raising his family of seven children, Prussing practiced law in Evanston, Illinois. Upon the death of his first wife, Louise, in 1900, he remarried Lillian Barrett and spent six months each year in Hollywood. Prussing had a lasting impact on Chicago, however, as he established several law-related clubs at the Union League Club, including the Law Club and the Judges' Table. He also wrote historical non-fiction about George Washington, Chicago legal history and important legal cases.

He died in California on his 81st birthday. His daughter Margaret Prussing was an actress and screenwriter. His papers are in the Newberry Library.
