= Vladimir Pruss =

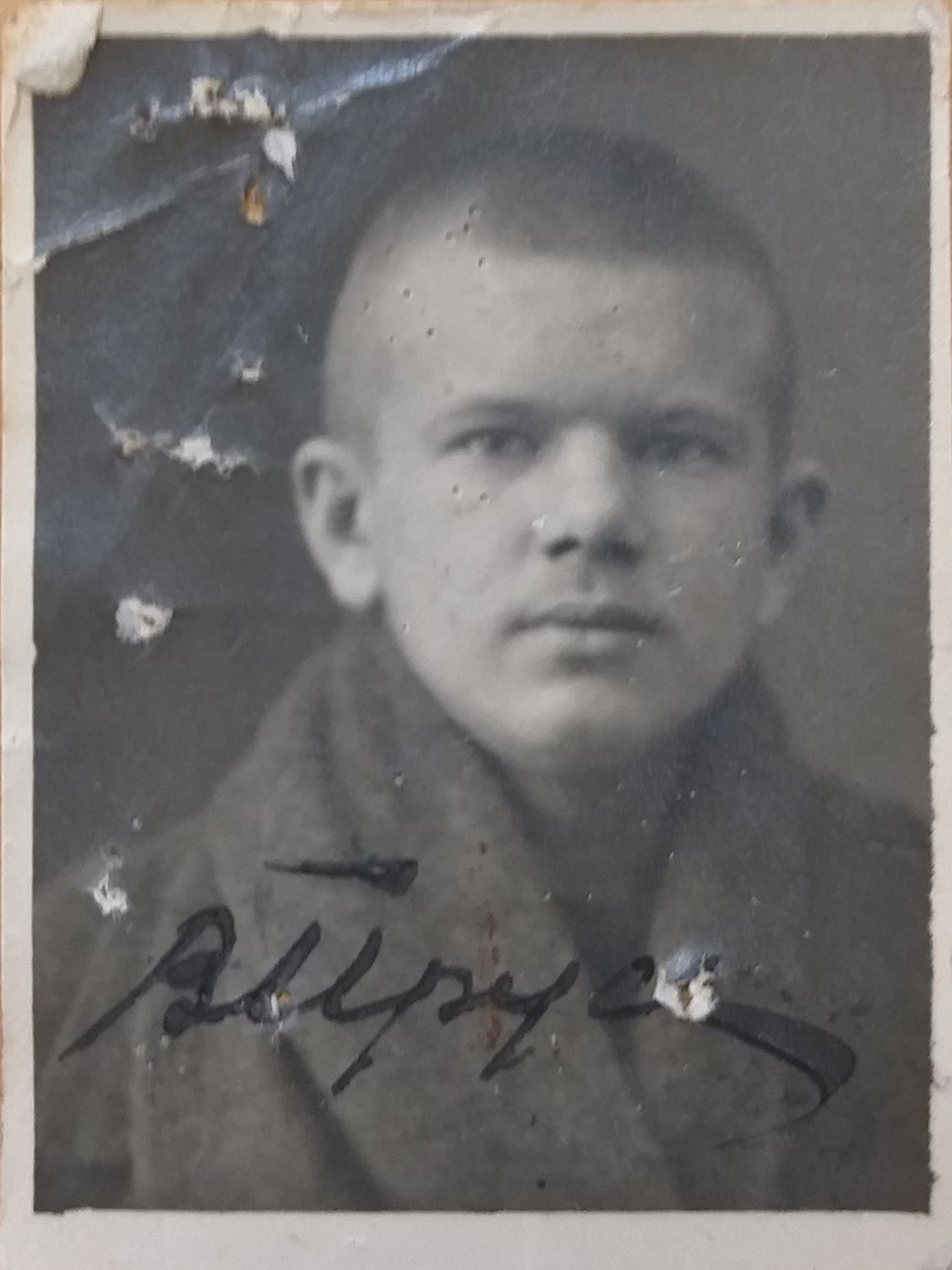
- Born: 1906; Saint Petersburg, Russian Empire
- Died: 1970s Kurgan, Soviet Union
- Occupation: historian

Vladimir Pruss (1906–1970s) was a Soviet historian who researched the social history of rural areas in the Southern Urals. He founded the history department at Atyrau University in Kazakhstan.

== Early life ==
Vladimir Pruss was born in a German-speaking Lutheran family of Baltic origin in Saint Petersburg, Russian Empire. His father, Johann Adam Woldemar Pruss, was a military doctor. Woldemar Pruss's father, Heinrich Adolph Pruss, was a Prussian Lithuanian who immigrated to what is now Belarus, worked as a railway station master and married Anna Elizabete Priede, a Latvian from Riga. Vladimir Pruss's mother, Charlotte von Morr, was a daughter of Jacob Morr, a German-Latvian pedagogue who once headed the Tsarskoye Selo Gymnasium.

Pruss grew up in Turku, Finland, where his father's regiment was stationed until the Russian Revolution. In 1920, his family moved to Tallinn where he got his first job as a clerk at the Soviet embassy to Estonia thanks to his father's friendship with the ambassador Leonid Stark. In 1923, the family moved back to Saint Petersburg where Vladimir went to university. Before settling on history as his career of choice, he also attended classes at the departments for construction and economics. During his studies in Saint Petersburg, Pruss met his future wife Musya Shklar, a Belarusian Jew from Viciebsk who also studied history.

In 1935, Pruss's younger brother Nikolai was arrested by the NKVD as an alleged anarchist counter-revolutionary. Shortly afterwards, Vladimir Pruss and his wife were disenfranchised, banned from living in the Soviet Union's largest cities and forcibly relocated to Shadrinsk as "family of an enemy of the state".

== Academic career ==
In 1940, the first higher education institution was established in Atyrau, Kazakhstan, originally under the name Guryev Teachers' Institute. Vladimir Pruss and Musya Shklar were both invited to teach at the new institute. Pruss became the first head of its history department and taught Soviet history, while his wife taught world history at the same department. During his work in Atyrau, Pruss wrote both academic papers and newspaper articles for laypeople interested in the history of Western Kazakhstan.

In the 1950s, the family moved to Kurgan where Pruss continued teaching and researching history at the local university. While in Kurgan, he published a number of papers on the history of agriculture and the social structure of local peasantry in the 19th century and co-authored a monograph on the history of Kurgan Oblast.

== Family ==
Vladimir Pruss's younger brother Nikolai was executed in a Gulag camp in Vorkuta during Stalin's Great Purge in 1938. His uncle Teodors Pruss was executed the same year for allegedly "organizing a group of Latvian nationalist spies" at a sports equipment factory in Moscow.

The only child of Vladimir Pruss and Musya Shklar, Irina Pruss, was born in Atyrau in 1943. She has worked as an editor at the popular science magazine Znanie — Sila for over 40 years.

== Bibliography ==
- Прусс, В. В. (16 February 1941). "Изучим историю нашей области [Let's study the history of our oblast]". Прикаспийская коммуна (in Russian).
- Прусс, В. В. (17 February 1941). "Біздің облыстың тарихын зерттейік [Let's study the history of our oblast]". Социалистік құрылыс (in Kazakh).
- Прусс, В. В. (1959). "Развитие капитализма в Южном Зауралье в конце XIX — начале XX вв. [Evolution of capitalism in the Southern Urals in the late 19th — early 20th century]". Ученые записки Курганского государственного педагогического института (in Russian) (1).
- Прусс, В. В. (1962). "Сельское хозяйство Шадринского уезда во второй половине XIX — XX вв. [Agriculture in Shadrinsk Uyezd in the late 19th — early 20th century]". Ученые записки Курганского государственного педагогического института (in Russian) (4).
- Прусс, В. В. (1966). "О специфических формах и степени расслоения крестьянства Южного Зауралья [On certain forms of social stratification and inequality among the peasantry of the Southern Urals]". Вопросы аграрной истории Урала и Западной Сибири (in Russian). Sverdlovsk.
- Прусс, В. В. (1968). "Развитие капитализма в сельском хозяйстве. Кустарные промыслы и торговля [Evolution of capitalism in agriculture. Handicrafts and trade]". Очерки истории Курганской области (in Russian). Chelyabinsk: Южно-Уральское книжное издательство.
- Прусс, В. В. (1968). "Экономическое развитие Южного Зауралья в начале XX века [Economic development of the Southern Urals in the early 20th century]". Очерки истории Курганской области (in Russian). Chelyabinsk: Южно-Уральское книжное издательство.
- Прусс, В. В.; Курочкин, А. М. (1968). "Культура и просвещение в Южном Зауралье в период капитализма [Culture and enlightenment in the Southern Urals in the era of capitalism]". Очерки истории Курганской области (in Russian). Chelyabinsk: Южно-Уральское книжное издательство.
