= 1st Krechowce Uhlan Regiment =

Mounted unit of the Polish Army

Coordinates: 50.6908°N 26.4186°E

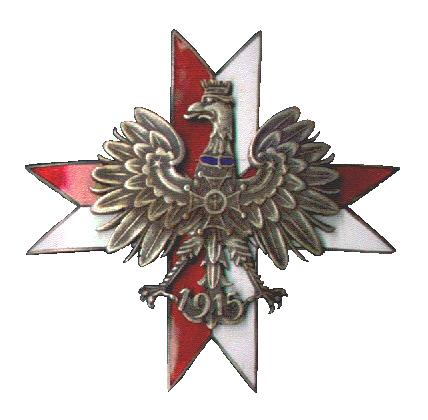
- Active: 1915–1947
- Country: Russian Empire (1914-1917); Russian Republic (1917) (Second Polish Republic) Poland (1918-1947)
- Branch: Imperial Russian Army (1915-1917); Russian Army (1917); Polish Army (1918-1939); Polish Army in the West (1939-1947)
- Type: Mounted Infantry
- Role: Infantry
- Size: Regiment
- Engagements: World War I: Battle of Pakosław; Battle of Krechowce; Polish-Soviet War: Battle of Wołodarka; Kiev offensive; Battle of Komarów; Polish–Ukrainian War: Battle of Lemberg; World War II: Invasion of Poland; Battle of Kock; Italian Campaign; Battle of Monte Cassino; Battle of Ancona; Operation Grapeshot; Battle of Bologna

The 1st Krechowce Uhlan Regiment was a mounted unit of the Polish Army, active in the Second Polish Republic. Its traditions were continued during World War II, by a regiment of the same name, which was part of Polish Armed Forces in the West. The 1st Krechowce Uhlan Regiment was formed in 1915, as a unit of the Imperial Russian Army. It fought in World War I, Polish–Soviet War and the Invasion of Poland, as part of Suwałki Cavalry Brigade. Until 1939, the regiment was stationed in Augustów. It ceased to exist in 1947. The first commander of the regiment was a Tsarist officer of Polish ethnicity, Colonel Bolesław Mościcki, who was killed in 1918 near Luninets. The last commander was Colonel Leon Strzelecki.

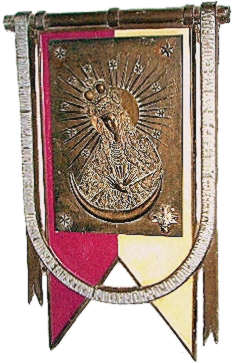
A commemorative tablet in St Andrew Bobola Church, Hammersmith, unofficial "garrison church" in London

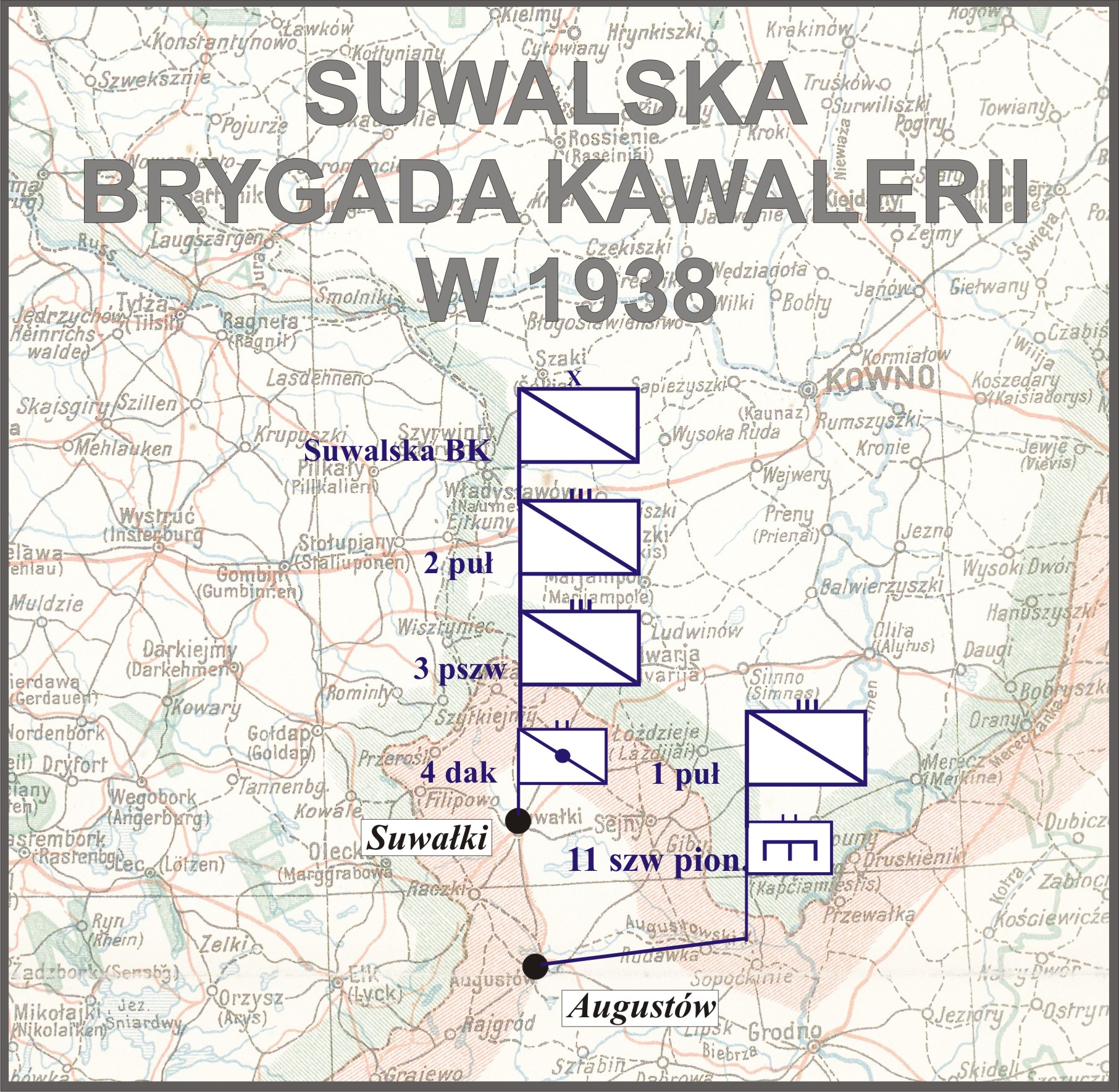
Suwalska BK w 1938

The First Uhlan Regiment was formed in 1915, as part of Imperial Russian Army's Puławy Legion. To commemorate its first victorious battle against German forces, the Battle of Krechowce, which took place on 24 July 1917, the regiment was named after the village of Krechowce near Stanisławów. Dissolved in May 1918, it was recreated in November of the same year by the Regency Council. From December 1918 until August 1919, it fought in the Polish–Ukrainian War, making itself famous after the defence of Gródek Jagielloński. In early 1920, the regiment was transferred to Pomerelia, where it took place in the so-called Poland's Wedding to the Sea (Puck, 10 February 1920).

During the Polish–Soviet War, the regiment fought mostly in Volhynia, engaging in a number of battles and skirmishes against 1st Cavalry Army of Semyon Budyonny. After the war, in spring 1921, it occupied former barracks of Imperial Russian Army in northern town of Augustów, where it remained until 1939. During the Invasion of Poland, the regiment, as part of Suwałki Cavalry Brigade, fought on until 6 October 1939, taking part in the Battle of Kock.

In the second half of 1941, the regiment was recreated as part of Polish Armed Forces in the East, the so-called Anders' Army. In mid-1942, after the Army of Władysław Anders had left the Soviet Union, the regiment was renamed into 1st Regiment of Armoured Cavalry, and in September 1942 was sent for training to British Iraq, where it remained until October 1943. After the return to Palestine, the regiment was equipped with M4 Sherman tanks, completing its training in December 1943 in Egypt.

During the Italian Campaign, 1st Krechowce Uhlan Regiment was part of 2nd Warsaw Armoured Brigade. It fought in the Battle of Monte Cassino, the Battle of Ancona, and captured the city of Bologna. The regiment was dissolved in 1947.

== Tradition of the Regiment ==
The 1st Uhlan Regiment claimed to be the continuation of the 1st Court Uhlan Regiment, which existed in the Polish–Lithuanian Commonwealth in the late 18th century (1776–1792–1794). In 1815–1831, the regiment was part of the army of Congress Poland, and as such, fought in the November Uprising, after which it was dissolved, together with whole army of Congress Poland.

In December 1914, during early months of World War I, Russian authorities announced the creation of two volunteer cavalry squadrons, as part of the so-called Puławy Legion. By mid January 1915, First Squadron was ready, and in the next 12 months the number of squadrons increased to such an extent, that Polish Ulan Division was created, with its headquarters in Babruysk. On 23 March 1917, the Division swore its oath, and on 3 April, it was renamed into 1st Uhlan Regiment. In June 1917, the regiment was sent to the area of Ternopil and Kalush. On 19 July, Colonel Bolesław Mościcki was named its commandant.

On 22 July 1917, Polish uhlans entered Stanisławów. The city was burning, plundered by marauders of the Russian Imperial Army. The uhlans moved in to protect its civilian population, and five days later they fought German units in the Battle of Krechowce. After this battle, the regiment was moved to Bessarabia, and finally, in early 1918, it returned to Babruysk. Following the agreement with German forces, the regiment was dissolved on 21 May 1918. Soon after the Battle of Krechowce, the unit came to be called the Krechowce Regiment. In 1919, its official name was changed into 1st Krechowce Uhlan Regiment of Colonel Bolesław Mościcki.

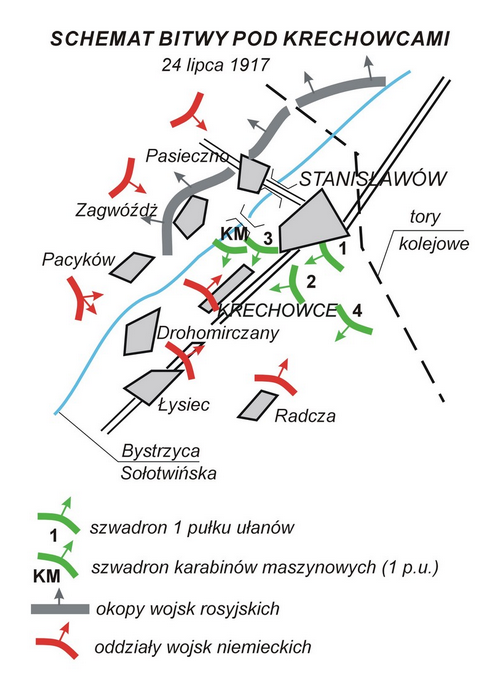
Battle of Krechowce

== Second Polish Republic ==
The regiment was dissolved in May 1918, but in October of that year, the Regency Council ordered creation of additional units of the newly created Polish Army. On 4 November 1918, 1st Uhlan Regiment was recreated, and to increase the flow of volunteers, its recruiting offices were opened in several locations. 2nd Squadron was formed in Warsaw, but on 22 November, it was moved to Kielce. Colonel Dunin-Markiewicz, on his way to Będzin, where he was ordered to form 3rd Squadron, stopped at Wolbrom, where he met with Rittmeister Pawel Korytko, commandant of reserve squadron of 2nd Austrian Uhlan Regiment. Both officers decided to unite their forces, thus 3rd Squadron was created.

1st Squadron was formed in Radomsko, 4th Squadron in Piotrków Trybunalski, and communications platoon in Gródek Jagielloński. At first, the headquarters of the regiment was located in Kielce: on 17 November 1918, it was moved to Wolbrom.

In early December 1918, all subunits of the regiment concentrated in Tarnow, in order to march eastwards, and help Polish defenders of the city of Lwów, which was threatened by Ukrainian forces (see Battle of Lemberg (1918)). On 17 December the soldiers went by train to Przemyśl, and all throughout winter of 1918/1919, the uhlans fought in the area of Lwów, mainly in Gródek Jagielloński.

In early spring 1919, the regiment, which suffered heavy losses, was transferred back to Wolbrom. Meanwhile, its flag had been brought from Bobrujsk, and on 7 May 1919, the regiment left Wolbrom again, towards Volhynia, where Polish offensive began (see Polish–Ukrainian War). The regiment, with its quick movement, took the Ukrainians by surprise, capturing the city of Lutsk, together with 600 prisoners, cannons, vehicles and food. On 23 May, after a few days' rest at Horochów, the uhlans captured Brody and Radziwiłłów. As a result of this success, the Poles seized 3,000 prisoners, several trains (including armoured train Sich Riflemen, which was immediately renamed into General Dowbor), machine guns and cannons.

In early July 1919, the regiment was merged with 9th Uhlan Regiment, creating 5th Cavalry Brigade. It operated in eastern Volhynia, capturing Zdołbunów (12 August), and in the autumn 1919, following the order of Polish Army Headquarters, was moved to Polish Pomerelia.

== Pomerelia ==
On 29 October 1919, the regiment arrived at Ciechocinek, remaining there until 16 January 1920. On the next day, Polish troops crossed former Russian - Prussian border, and entered Pomerelia. After a few weeks' march via Chełmża, Popowo Biskupie, Grudziądz, Nowe, Pelplin and Żukowo the uhlans reached Puck, where on 10 February 1920, Poland's Wedding to the Sea took place, with General Józef Haller present.

== Polish–Soviet War ==
In mid-April 1920, the regiment was transferred back to Volhynia, where it joined the Cavalry Division of General Jan Romer. Its task was to capture the town of Koziatyn, with its important rail station and Red Army supply depot. In two days, Polish cavalry, with 20 officers, 600 soldiers and 10 machine guns, crossed 160 kilometers (see Battle of Koziatyn). The raid was a spectacular success, as Poles captured the town, with a number of prisoners of war.

After a short rest, on 2 May 1920, the regiment headed towards Bila Tserkva, pushing away Soviet forces. On 15 May, the regiment concentrated in Stara Syniava, where it received a new commandant, General Aleksander Karnicki. In late May 1920, the regiment defeated Siemion Budionnyi's 1st Cavalry Army in the Battle of Wolodarka.

Following Soviet counterattack to the Polish Kiev offensive, the regiment began to retreat westwards. By 19 June, it defended the line of the Sluch River, with heavy losses, which shrank its manpower. In late July 1920, the regiment was sent to Tarnow, to recuperate and increase its refill its ranks with new recruits. On 22 July, the unit came to Zamość, joining the forces of General Juliusz Rómmel. Until 8 August it fought along the Styr River, but due to numerical superiority of the enemy, it was forced to retreat to Radziechów. Pushed by the enemy, the regiment crossed the Bug River, entering Żółkiew. There, it attacked a wing of the Budionnyi army. On 29 August, the regiment captured Tyszowce, and then fought the Soviets near Zamość, in the famous Battle of Komarów.

By mid-September, the regiment re-entered Volhynia, chasing the retreating Bolsheviks. As part of General Juliusz Rómmel's Cavalry Corps, in October 1920 it captured Korosten. Soon afterwards, armistice was declared.

== Interbellum Period ==
In winter 1920/21, the regiment camped near Lutsk. In spring 1921, it was moved to Hrubieszów, and then to Augustów, to its garrison, located in former barracks of the Imperial Russian Army. On 24 July 1925, it celebrated its 10th anniversary, with General Władysław Sikorski present. On 24 July 1932, it celebrated its 15th anniversary, with President Ignacy Mościcki, and a number of high-ranking military officials, such as Edward Smigly-Rydz, Tadeusz Kutrzeba, Juliusz Rómmel and Stanisław Grzmot-Skotnicki. In 1927, the Association of Krechowce Officers was created, which organized meetings and balls. In the early 1920s, a village in Volhynia was (Osada Krechowiecka) was settled with veterans of the Regiment (see Osadnik), and in 1935, Officers' Yacht Club with its own pier was opened on Biale Augustowskie Lake (this lake came to be known as Krechowce Lake). Residents of the Osada Krechowiecka village were in 1940 forcibly resettled to Siberia by the NKVD.

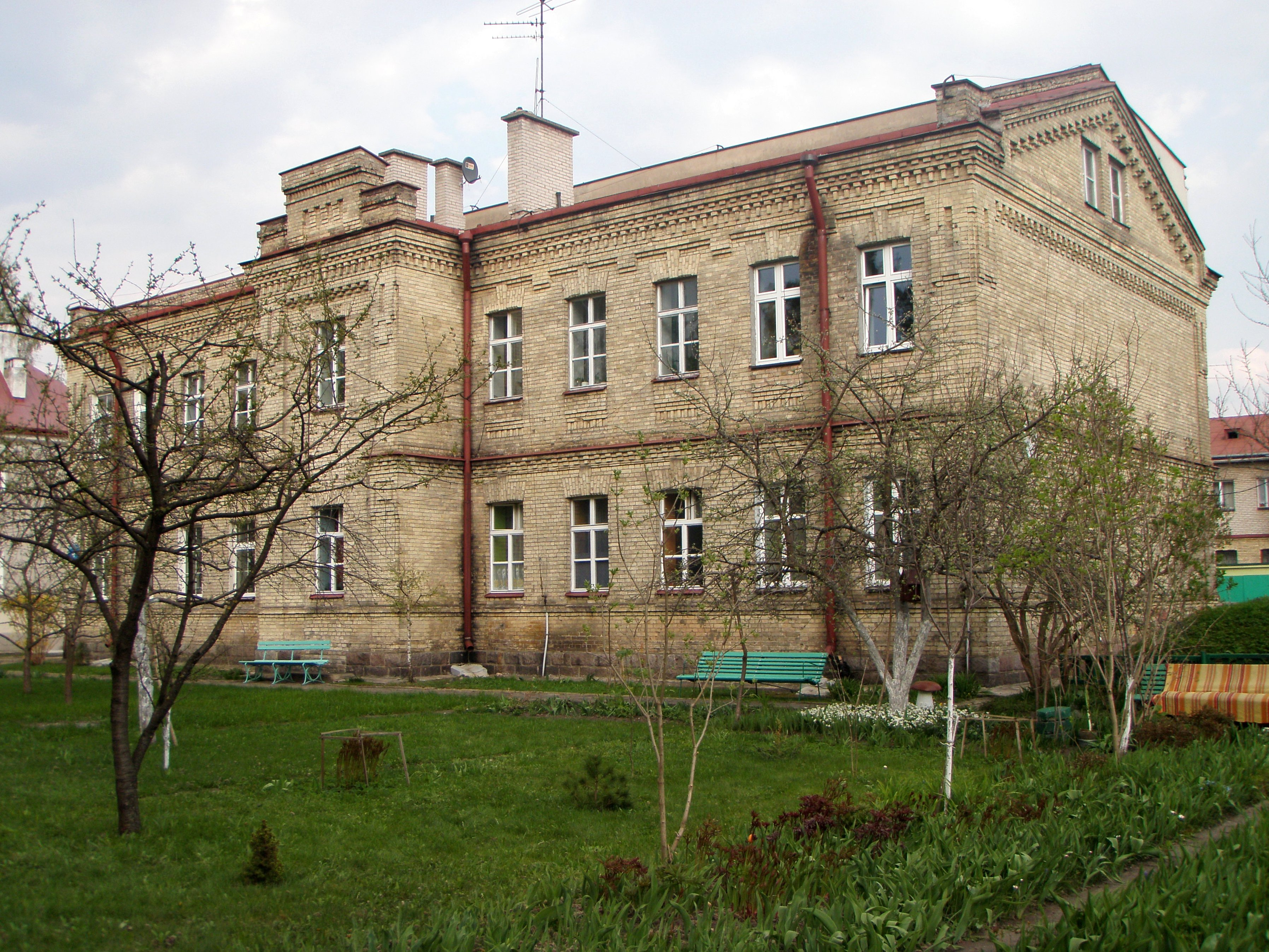
Former barracks of the regiment in Augustów

The regiment was famous for Krechowiak, the horse of Colonel Bolesław Mościcki, which, together with Colonel Karol Rómmel, won 10th spot at the 1924 Olympic Games in Paris. The legendary horse had its own, separate stable, and after its death in 1939, Krechowiak was handed to Polish Army Museum in Warsaw, where it was stuffed and presented to visitors. To commemorate the Battle of Krechowce, special gorgets were made, with Black Madonna of Częstochowa. The gorgets were handed to officers and uhlans after 20 years of service. In the Second Polish Republic, 1st Uhlan Regiment maintained special ties with 12th Podole Uhlan Regiment and 14th Yazlovets Uhlan Regiment: the three units had fought the Bolsheviks at Komarów.

== 1939 Invasion of Poland ==
The mobilisation of the regiment took place on 24 August 1939. On 1 September, the unit took positions near the village of Raczki, which at that time was located 10 kilometers from the border with East Prussia.

In the night of 2/3 September 1939, two squadrons under Colonel Antoni Burlingis and Colonel Zygmunt Nowinski attacked German border posts at the villages of Kechlensdorf (now Zocie) and Auersberg (now Turowo). The regiment planned a raid on East Prussia, but Polish Army headquarters did not support this idea. Following the orders, the regiment withdrew towards Zambrów and Tykocin. On 6 September, the Wehrmacht broke through Polish defences, and crossed the Narew near Różan. As a result, elements of the regiment were engaged in hand-to-hand combat with subunits of the Panzer Division Kempf.

On 10 September, after a short rest, the regiment took positions near the folwark of Wadolki-Borowe, with its left wing supported by 71st Infantry Regiment of 18th Infantry Division. Soon it was attacked by German 20th Motorized Infantry Division. First enemy assault was repelled, but in subsequent attacks, Colonel Jan Litewski, commandant of the regiment, was killed and his post was taken temporarily by Rittmeister Tomasz Mineyko, who ordered a withdrawal. The Battle of Zambrów ended in Polish defeat.

After a short rest the regiment marched towards the forests near Dąbrowa Wielka. In the night of 12 September, remnants of 2nd Uhlan Regiment, destroyed by the Wehrmacht in the Battle of Wizna, reached the same forest. Colonel Karol Anders of 2nd Regiment took over command of the united forces. On the next day a column of German motorized infantry set off from Czyżew, trying to destroy Polish cavalry. Near the village of Kamien, Polish soldiers halted the enemy, destroying 10 tanks and capturing a number of prisoners.

In the night, after a quick march, the uhlans reached the road Wysokie Mazowieckie - Brańsk, crossing the Mien river after a bloody skirmish with the enemy. In the morning of 13 September, the regiment reached the area of Hodyszewo. After a meeting of officers, the uhlans were ordered to fight their way to the Białowieża Forest. In case of a failure, the regiment was to head towards Wołkowysk, where Reserve Center of Suwałki Cavalry Brigade was located. Near Olszewo, Polish soldiers faced an armored regiment of German 3rd Panzer Division. The Germans lost 20 tanks and armored carriers, but Polish losses also were very heavy and the regiment dispersed, as some of its subunits decided to march to Wołkowysk on their own.

On 16 September, the uhlans finally reached Białowieża, where the remnants of the regiments were incorporated into Cavalry Brigade Edward, named after Colonel Edward Milewski. On 21 September, the regiment arrived at the village of Teresin. Soon afterwards, a skirmish with the Red Army, advancing from the East, took place in which the Poles lost 5 soldiers. Marching south, Polish 3rd Regiment of Mounted Rifles entered the village of Kalenkowicze near Kamieniec, whose residents had built "welcome gates" for the Red Army, adorned with red flags and Soviet symbols. As a reprisal for this betrayal, Kalenkowicze was burned.

On 24 September, the 1st Regiment, which was part of Brigade Edward, Cavalry Division Zaza (named after General Zygmunt Podhorski) crossed the Bug River near Niemirow and kept marching southwards. Fighting its way against Soviet and German units, the uhlans hoped to eventually reach the Hungarian border, located hundreds of kilometers south. On 28 September the Division reached Ostrów Lubelski, where it met with forces of Independent Operational Group Polesie. General Podhorski suggested that the two groups join forces and march towards the border, but General Franciszek Kleeberg preferred to aid the besieged garrison of Warsaw.

Brigade Edward was ordered to protect the Wieprz river crossing at Kijany. After several German attacks, it had to retreat behind the river. On 30 September, uhlans of the Zaza Cavalry Division merged with the Polesie Operational Group. In the Battle of Kock (1939), 1st Krechowce Uhlan Regiment was stationed near Józefów, and tasked with attacking left wing of German positions. Due to heavy enemy fire, the uhlans were unable to achieve success, and retreated to Grabowo Szlacheckie. At midday of 6 October, Polish forces capitulated.

During the September Campaign, 1st Krechowce Uhlan Regiment was commanded by Colonel Jan Litewski, and his deputy, Colonel Karol Anders.

The 1st Krechowce Uhlan Regiment was recreated in the second half of 1941, as part of Polish Armed Forces in the East.

== See also ==
- Stefan Tyszkiewicz
- Polish cavalry
- 2nd Regiment of Grochow Uhlans
