= Narcyz Witczak-Witaczyński =

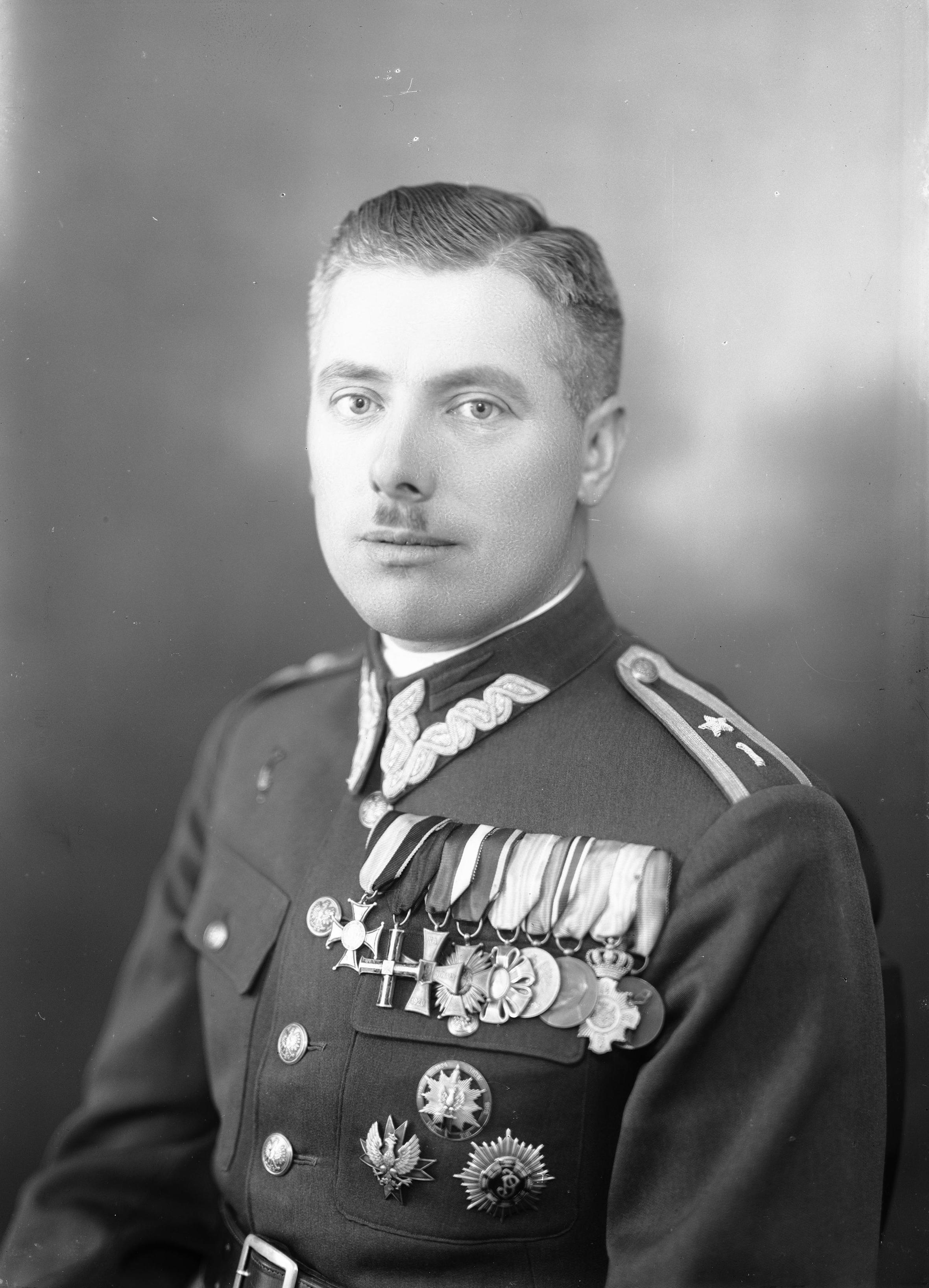
- Narcyz Witczak-Witaczyński in 1937
- Born: October 29, 1898; Chojny, Congress Poland
- Died: 27 March 1943 (aged 44)
- Military career
- Branch: Polish Armed Forces
- Units: 1st Krechowce Uhlan Regiment; Chief of State's Bodyguard Squadron; President of the Republic of Poland's Bodyguard Squadron; 1st Piłsudski Light Cavalry Regiment; 1st Mounted Rifle Regiment
- Conflicts: Battle of Krechowce; World War II

Narcyz Witczak-Witaczyński (29 October 1898 - 27 March 1943) was a Polish military officer and photographer.

== Biography ==
After escaping from his family home, on August 13, 1915, he volunteered for the 2nd squadron of the Puławy Legion Uhlans, which was reformed into a division and later the 1st Regiment of Polish Uhlans at the Imperial Russian Army. For his participation in the Battle of Krechowce, he was awarded the Virtuti Militari order following the regaining of independent by Poland and the establishment of the Second Polish Republic. He then fought with the 1st Polish Corps commanded by General Józef Dowbor-Muśnicki against the Bolsheviks. After the Corps was disbanded, he went to the Kiev region and then to Vologda. There, on August 5, 1918, he was arrested, taken to Moscow and incorporated into the Mazovian Uhlan Regiment, fighting on the Bolshevik side. At Kazan, while trying to lead his platoon to the other side of the front, he was wounded and taken to a hospital in Moscow. After his recovery and the dissolution of the Masovian Uhlan Regiment, he was incorporated into the 1st Latvian Cavalry Regiment. He escaped from it near Riga, but was arrested and imprisoned in Mitau. After the Germans occupied Mitau, he was taken to Germany as a prisoner of war and held in prisoner of war camps. On July 22, 1919, he escaped from the camp in Frankfurt (Oder) and returned to Poland.

On August 22, 1919, he rejoined the 1st Krechowce Uhlan Regiment. On September 7, 1919, he was transferred to the Chief of State's Personal Squadron, where he served as a sergeant - squadron chief from December 13, 1919 to May 26, 1926 (on December 19, 1922, the unit was renamed the President of the Republic's Personal Squadron). In the Polish–Soviet War, he took part in battles on the Volhynian front from April to June 1920. After graduating from the School of Professional Cavalry NCOs in Jaworów in 1927, he worked at the Ministry of Military Affairs. Then, in the years 1928-1931, he served in the 1st Regiment of Józef Piłsudski's cavalry. On 21 September 1931, he was transferred to the 1st Regiment of Mounted Riflemen in Garwolin. He was the educational officer of the regiment from 13 July 1935. He was promoted to the rank of ensign on 1 February 1936.

Along with the regiment, he took part in the September Campaign in 1939. After the capitulation, he returned to Garwolin and began, under the pseudonym "Kościesza", creating a conspiratorial organization, bringing together soldiers of the 1st Regiment of Mounted Riflemen - ZWZ/AK Obwodu "Gołąb". In the District Command he was the head of counterintelligence. From 1941 he edited the underground magazine "Apel". On 17 July 1942 he was arrested by the German occupation authorities. He was imprisoned in Pawiak until December 1942, and then in the camp at Majdanek concentration camp, where he died on 27 March 1943.

=== Activity ===
From the beginning of his service in the Adjutant Squadron, he documented the history of the Polish Armed Forces and especially the everyday life of the cavalry, using photography. He was one of the few who had the right to photograph the Chief of State and Commander-in-Chief of the Polish Army, Marshal Józef Piłsudski, and the most important figures of the Second Polish Republic, politicians and soldiers. He was one of the most popular military photojournalists. His photographs were published in the magazines "Wiarus", "Jeździec i Hodowca", "Polska Zbrojna" and "Ilustrowany Kurier Codzienny". His illustrations are included in the most famous pre-war publication on the history of the cavalry - Księga Jazdy Polskiej (Warsaw, 1938). His photographs were published as postcards, folders and envelopes. He won the first prize in the military photography competition in 1937 and many other awards and distinctions. His photographic archive of around four thousand negatives was transferred in January 2014 by his heirs to the National Digital Archives.

From the moment it was founded, he served as the editorial secretary of the weekly "Wiarus" for professional non-commissioned officers of the Polish Army, where his articles were also published. He also wrote for the magazines "Jeździec i Hodowca" and "Polska Zbrojna". As an educational officer, he edited the regimental magazine "Nowinki".

== Memory ==
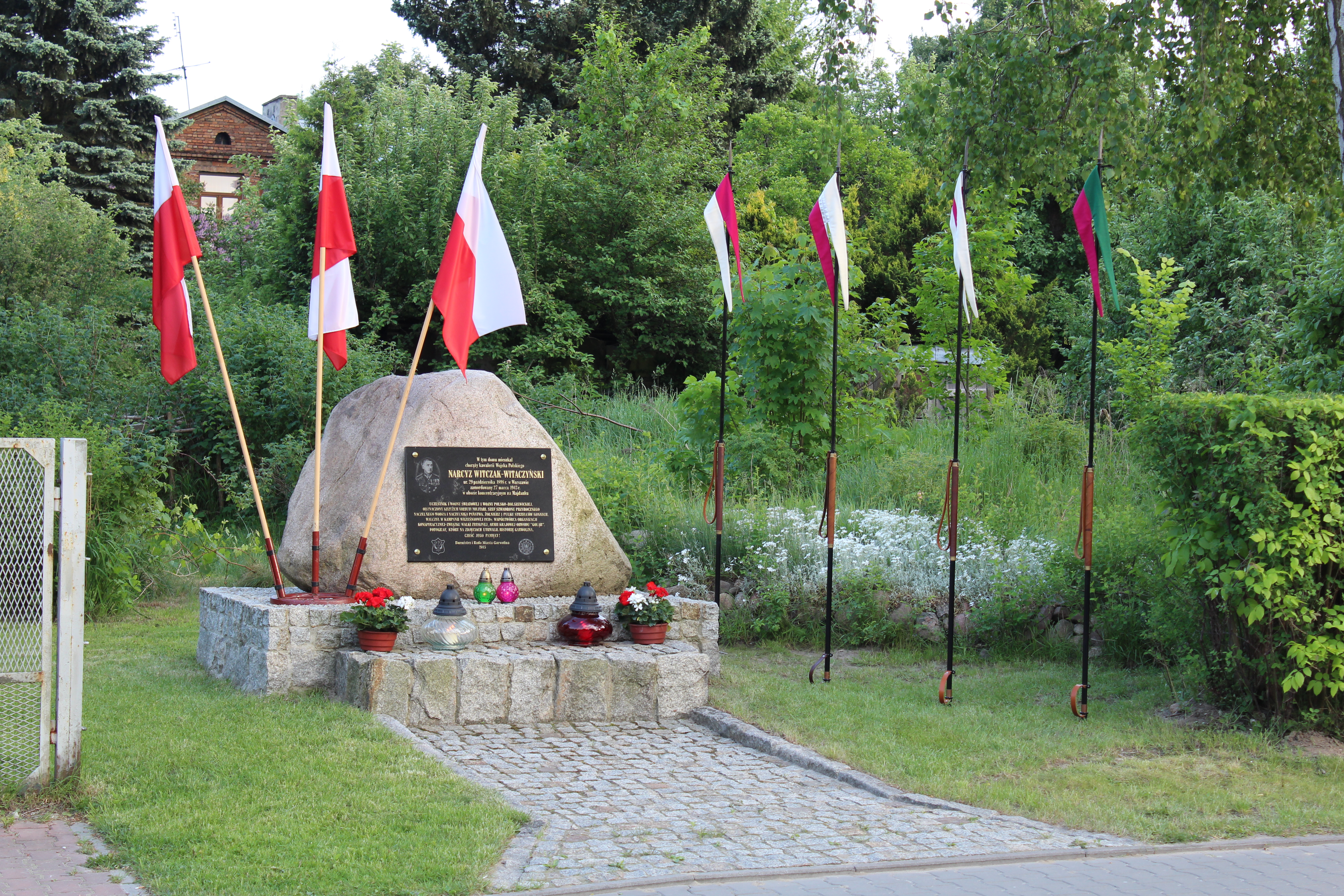
Memorial stone dedicated to Witczak-Witaczyński in Garwolin

On October 29, 2015, a commemorative plaque dedicated to Narcyz Witczak-Witaczyński was unveiled on the external wall of the Collegiate Church of the Transfiguration of the Lord in Garwolin. Also on the same day, in front of Narcyz Witczak-Witaczyński's house on Polna Street in Garwolin (where he last lived), a commemorative stone with a plaque commemorating Narcyz Witczak-Witaczyński was unveiled. The unveiling of both plaques funded by the City of Garwolin was performed by the Mayor of the City Tadeusz Mikulski, the Chairman of the City Council Marek Jonczak and the daughters of the ensign: Barbara Witczak-Witaczyńska and Krystyna Witczak. By decision of the Garwolin City Council of April 1, 2017, the bridge over the Wilga River in the center of Garwolin was named after Narcyz Witczak-Witaczyński.

Two publications devoted entirely to Narcyz Witczak-Witaczyński were created. In 2013 the album "Lancemen, Uhlans and Horse Riflemen in the Photography of Narcyz Witczak-Witaczyński" was published, and in 2017 the album "Narcyz Witczak-Witaczyński" published by the National Digital Archives.

== Awards ==
- Silver Cross of the Order of Virtuti Militari (1921)
- Cross of Independence (15 April 1932)
- Cross of Valour (1922)
- Bronze Cross of Merit (1937)
- Commemorative Medal for the War of 1918–1921 (1928)
- Silver Academic Laurel (7 November 1936)
- Medal of the Tenth Anniversary of Regained Independence (1928)
- Bronze Medal for Long Service (1938)
- Cross of the Home Army (posthumously, 15 April 1997)
- Amaranth Ribbon (1918)
- National Order of Faithful Service, 1st Class (Romania, 1923)
- Victory Medal (Inter-Allied, 1925)
- Cross of St. George (Russia, 1917)
- Commemorative Badge of the 1st Light Cavalry Regiment
- Commemorative Badge of the 1st Krechowiec Uhlan Regiment
- Commemorative Badge of the 1st Mounted Riflemen Regiment
- Commemorative Badge of the 1st Polish Corps
