= Mikołajki (disambiguation) =

Mikołajki may refer to the following places:

- Mikołajki, Kuyavian-Pomeranian Voivodeship (north-central Poland)
- Mikołajki, Podlaskie Voivodeship (north-east Poland)
- Mikołajki in Warmian-Masurian Voivodeship (north Poland)
- Mikołajki, Elbląg County in Warmian-Masurian Voivodeship (north Poland)
- Mikołajki, Ełk County in Warmian-Masurian Voivodeship (north Poland)
- Mikołajki, Nowe Miasto County in Warmian-Masurian Voivodeship (north Poland)

== See also ==
- Saint Nicholas' Day, called Mikołajki in Polish
