= Dudki =

Dudki may refer to the following places:

- Dudki, Kutno County in Łódź Voivodeship (central Poland)
- Dudki, Radomsko County in Łódź Voivodeship (central Poland)
- Dudki, Podlaskie Voivodeship (north-east Poland)
- Dudki, Masovian Voivodeship (east-central Poland)
- Dudki, Silesian Voivodeship (south Poland)
- Dudki, Ełk County in Warmian-Masurian Voivodeship (north Poland)
- Dudki, Olecko County in Warmian-Masurian Voivodeship (north Poland)
