= Marcinowo =

Marcinowo may refer to the following places in Poland:

- Marcinowo, Lower Silesian Voivodeship (south-west Poland)
- Marcinowo, Ełk County in Warmian-Masurian Voivodeship (north Poland)
- Marcinowo, Gołdap County in Warmian-Masurian Voivodeship (north Poland)
