= Bolesław Mościcki =

Polish colonel (1877–1918)

Bolesław Euzebiusz Mościcki
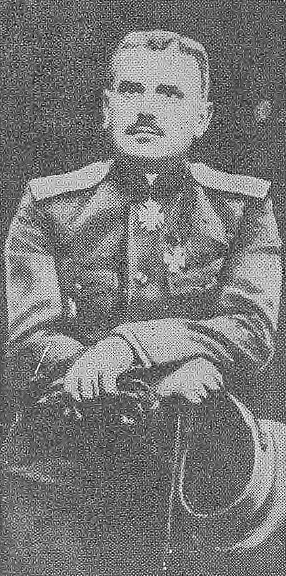
- Born: 14 December 1877; Wysokie Mazowieckie, Poland
- Died: 18 February 1918 (aged 40) near Luninets, Belarus
- Buried: Minsk, Belarus
- Allegiance: Russian Empire
- Branch: Imperial Russian Army
- Service years: 1902–1918
- Rank: Polkovnik
- Conflicts: Russo-Japanese War; World War I; Battle of Krechowce

Bolesław Euzebiusz Mościcki (14 December 1877 – 18 February 1918) was a Colonel of both the Imperial Russian Army and Polish Army. Born in Wysokie Mazowieckie in the Łomża Governorate of Congress Poland, Moscicki served during World War I in the 1st Uhlan Regiment of the Pulawy Legion. He died on 18 February 1918 near Luninets.

In 1902, after graduation from Officer School of the Russian Army, Moscicki was sent to Manchuria, to serve in the Amur Cavalry. He fought in the Russo-Japanese War, and, while still a soldier of the Amur Cavalry, fought in World War I. In 1917 Moscicki was promoted to polkovnik, and on 19 July that year, at the village of Porohy near Nadworna, he was named commandant of 1st Uhlan Regiment, part of the so-called Pulawy Legion. Five days later, Moscicki fought in the Battle of Krechowce, in which his unit defeated Bavarians of the Imperial German Army. To commemorate this victory, 1st Uhlan Regiment came to be known as 1st Krechowce Uhlan Regiment.

In February 1918 Moscicki, dressed in mufti, tried to cross Russian - German frontline in the region of Polesie. He wanted to get in touch with the Regency Council, but the mission failed when he was captured and killed by Bolsheviks and armed peasantry near Luninets. Moscicki was buried in Minsk, and in 1921 his body was transported to Warsaw, where a second funeral took place at Holy Cross Church. He was posthumously awarded the Virtuti Militari by Naczelnik Jozef Pilsudski.
