= Stożne =

Stożne may refer to the following places:

- Stożne, Lubusz Voivodeship (west Poland)
- Stożne, Ełk County in Warmian-Masurian Voivodeship (north Poland)
- Stożne, Olecko County in Warmian-Masurian Voivodeship (north Poland)
