= Pavel Sytin =

Russian and Soviet general (1870–1938)

Pavel Pavlovich Sytin
- Born: 30 July 1870; Skopin, Russia
- Died: 22 August 1938 (aged 68) Moscow, Russia
- Allegiance: Russian Empire (1892–1917); Russian Republic (1917); Soviet Russia (1917–1922); Soviet Union (1922–1934)
- Branch: Imperial Russian Army; Russian Army; Red Army
- Service years: 1892–1934
- Rank: Major General
- Commands: 37th Infantry Division; 11th Infantry Division; 2nd Oryol Infantry Division; Southern Front
- Conflicts: Russo-Japanese War; World War I; Battle of Krechowce; Russian Civil War
- Awards: Order of Saint Stanislaus; Order of Saint Anna; Order of Saint Vladimir; St. George Sword; The Highest Favor

Pavel Pavlovich Sytin (Russian: Павел Павлович Сытин) (30 July [O.S. 18 July] 1870 Skopin – 22 August 1938 Moscow) was a Russian and Soviet military leader who reached the rank of major general in the Imperial Russian Army. He fought in the Russo-Japanese War and World War I.

== Biography ==
=== Early life ===
Sytin was born in Skopin in the Russian Empire's Ryazan Governorate on 30 July (O.S. 18 July) 1870, the son of a rider in a lancer regiment who had been promoted to a position as an official in a military department. He graduated from the Kiev Cadet School (later the Kiev Military School) in 1892.

=== Imperial Russian Army ===
Upon graduation from the Kiev Cadet School in 1892, Sytin began his Imperial Russian Army career. He graduated from the Nikolayev Academy of the General Staff in 1899 in the first category. He took part in the Russo-Japanese War of 1904–1905. From 1908 to 1909 he was the head of the combat department of the headquarters of the Brest-Litoŭsk Fortress. In 1909, he became an instructor at a military school, then became a senior adjutant at the headquarters of the Kronstadt Fortress.

During World War I, Sytin commanded an artillery battery, a brigade, and the 37th Infantry Division. He was promoted to major general on 23 January 1917.

The February Revolution deposed Tsar Nicholas II in March 1917, and the Russian Provisional Government that took power proclaimed a new Russian Republic. Sytin served in the post-imperial Russian Army. He commanded the 11th Infantry Division during the Battle of Krechowce on 24 July 1917.

=== Red Army ===
The Bolsheviks overthrew the Russian Provisional Government in the October Revolution on 7 November 1917, beginning the Russian Civil War. Sytin sided with the Bolsheviks. General Anton Denikin, an opponent of the Bolsheviks, White movement leader, and a commander of White Army forces, mentioned him as follows:

Many schemers came up with plans to save Russia. I had [as my subordinate in the Imperial Russian Army], by the way, the current Bolshevik “commander-in-chief,” then a general, Pavel Sytin. He proposed the following measure to strengthen the front: to declare that land — of landowners, the state, the church — be given free of charge to the peasants, but exclusively to those who fight on the front. “I mentioned,” said Sytin, “this proposal to Kaledin [i.e., General Alexey Kaledin], but he grabbed his head [and said] 'What you preach, it's pure demagogy!'...” Sytin left without land and without ... [command of] a division. He later easily reconciled with the Bolshevik theory of communist land use.

In December 1917 Sytin was elected as the commander of the Red Army's 18th Army Corps by the soldiers congress. In March 1918, he became the commander of screening units in the Bryansk region in the Red Western Front, and in May 1918 he served as the head of the Soviet Russian delegation conducting peace negotiations with the Germans in Kharkov. In July 1918 he took command of the 2nd Oryol Infantry Division. In early September 1918 he became the leader of screening units in the Red Southern Front, and in September–October 1918 he commanded the Red Southern Front. The troops under his leadership fought major battles with the White Cossacks, holding back anti-Bolshevik forces in a vast space from Bryansk to Kizlyar, although the attempted advance of Red Southern Front troops along the Balashov axis was not successful due to poor preparation.

Sytin was recalled from the front and appointed head of the administrative affairs department of the Revolutionary Military Council. From 1920 to 1921, he was a military representative to the plenipotentiary of the Soviet Russia in the Democratic Republic of Georgia. In October 1922 he began duty as an instructor at the Military Academy of the Red Army. From 1924 to 1927 he worked in the Military Historical Administration for the study and use of the experience of war. In November 1927, he was assigned to the Revolutionary Military Council to undertake important assignments for the Soviet Union's armed forces. He retired in December 1934.

=== Later life ===
After he retired, Sytin became a researcher at the Central State Archive of the Red Army. During the Great Purge, he was arrested on 27 February 1938 and charged with participating in a counterrevolutionary organization. The Military Collegium of the Supreme Court of the Soviet Union sentenced him to death on 22 August 1938. He was shot and buried the same day at the Kommunarka shooting ground in the Moscow Region. He was rehabilitated on 16 March 1957.

== Awards and honors ==
- Order of Saint Anna Fourth Class with inscription "For Courage" (1904)
- Order of Saint Stanislaus Third Class with Swords and Bow (1904)
- Order of Saint Anna Third Class with Swords and Bow (1904)
- Order of Saint Stanislaus (House of Romanov) Second Class with Swords (1905)
- Order of Saint Anna Second Class with Swords (1905)
- Order of Saint Vladimir Fourth Class with Swords and Bow (1906)
- Order of Saint Vladimir Third Class with Swords (11 February 1915)
- St. George Sword (24 February 1915)
- The Highest Favor "for distinction in action against the enemy" (5 April 1915)
