= Ginie, Warmian-Masurian Voivodeship =

Ginie
- Village
- Location within Poland
- Coordinates: 53°52′38″N 22°46′17″E
- Country: Poland
- Voivodeship: Warmian-Masurian
- County: Ełk
- Gmina: Kalinowo
- Population: 80

Ginie [ˈɡiɲɛ] is a village in the administrative district of Gmina Kalinowo, within Ełk County, Warmian-Masurian Voivodeship, in northern Poland.
