= Laski Wielkie, Warmian-Masurian Voivodeship =

Laski Wielkie
- Village
- Location within Poland
- Coordinates: 53°50′20″N 22°30′28″E
- Country: Poland
- Voivodeship: Warmian-Masurian
- County: Ełk
- Gmina: Kalinowo

Laski Wielkie (Polish pronunciation: [ˈlaskʲi ˈvjɛlkʲɛ]) is a village in the administrative district of Gmina Kalinowo, within Ełk County, Warmian-Masurian Voivodeship, in northern Poland.
