= Golubka =

- Village
- Location within Poland
- Coordinates: 53°51′41″N 22°32′11″E
- Country: Poland
- Voivodeship: Warmian-Masurian
- County: Ełk
- Gmina: Kalinowo
- Population: 1,200
- Website: http://www.golubka.tnb.pl

Golubka [ɡɔˈlupka] is a village in the administrative district of Gmina Kalinowo, within Ełk County, Warmian-Masurian Voivodeship, in northern Poland.
