= 37th Infantry Division (Russian Empire) =

- 37-я пехотная дивизия
- Active: 1914–1918
- Country: Russian Empire
- Branch: Russian Imperial Army
- Role: Infantry

The 37th Infantry Division (Russian: 37-я пехотная дивизия, 37-ya Pekhotnaya Diviziya) was an infantry formation of the Russian Imperial Army. Its headquarters was located at Saint Petersburg.

== Organization ==
It was part of the 18th Army Corps.

- 1st Brigade
  - 145th Infantry Regiment
  - 146th Infantry Regiment
- 2nd Brigade
  - 147th Infantry Regiment
  - 148th Infantry Regiment
- 37th Artillery Brigade

== Commanders ==
- 10.13.1863 - xx.xx.xxxx - Lieutenant General Teterevnikov, Nikolai Kuzmich
- 07.24.1866 - 03.21.1879 - major general (from 28.03.1871 - lieutenant general) Chenger, Xavier (Onufry) Osipovich
- хх.хх.1879 - хх.хх.1888 - Lieutenant General Gelfreich, Alexander Bogdanovich
- 01/20/1888 - 12/21/1893 - Lieutenant-General Prince Romanovsky Eugen Maximilianovich, 5th Duke of Leuchtenberg
- 01/05/1900 - 11/15/1901 - Lieutenant General Skaryatin, Nikolai Dmitrievich
- 11/15/1901 - 03/16/1903 - Lieutenant General Maltzov, Ivan Sergeevich
- 04/18/1903 - 10/23/1904 - Lieutenant General Chekmarev, Andrey Ivanovich
- 10.23.1904 - 08.18.1905 - Lieutenant General Andrey Selivanov
- 04/30/1907 - 11/19/1909 - Lieutenant General Kurganovich, Konstantin Osipovich
- 11/19/1909 - 07/30/1912 - major general (from 06/06/1909 - lieutenant general) Vasily Flug
- 07/30/1912 - 03/27/1915 - Lieutenant General Andrei Zayonchkovski
- 07/17/1915 - 10/17/1917 - Lieutenant General of Wadenschern, Torsten Karlovich
- 10.17.1917 - xx.xx.xxxx - Major General Pavel Sytin
