= Antoni Reutt =

Polish lieutenant colonel (1861–1917)

Antoni Teofilovich Reutt
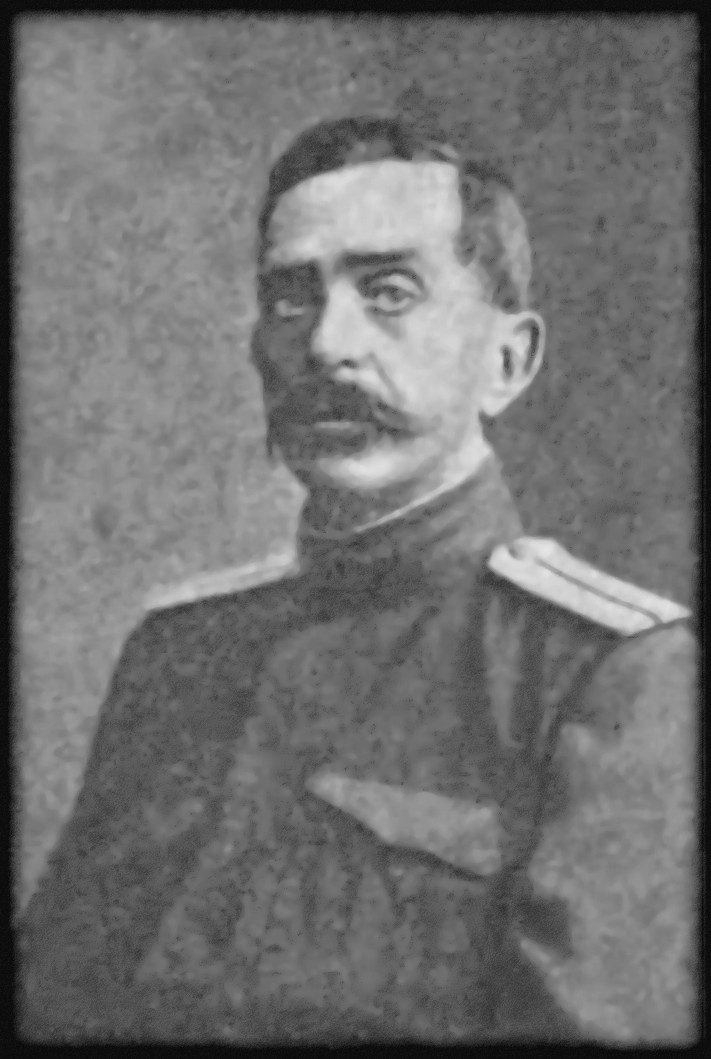
- Born: 19 March 1861; Polotsky Uyezd, Vitebsk Governorate, Russian Empire
- Died: 1917; Petrograd
- Allegiance: Russian Empire
- Service / branch: Imperial Russian Army
- Rank: Podpolkovnik
- Commands: Puławy Legion
- Battles / wars: Russo-Japanese War; World War I; Battle of Pakosław

Antoni Teofilovich Reutt (Russian: Антоний Теофилович Ройтт; Polish: Antoni Teofilowicz Roitt; 19 March [O.S. 7 March] 1861 – 1917) was a Polish lieutenant colonel who served in the Imperial Russian Army.

== Life ==
He was born on 19 March 1861 on the Tadulin estate, in Polotsky Uyezd, to Stanisław and Anna née Jankowski.

In 1902, he was transferred to the Russian Far East and served in the Russo-Japanese War as staff captain. Before World War I, he served in a dragoon unit in Ukraine. When Russia mobilized in 1914, he was transferred to the Southwestern Front as lieutenant colonel. On 13 January 1915, he was appointed commander of the Puławy Legion, and four days later he took command of it. On 20 March 1915, he went to the front at the head of the Legion. He was wounded during the Battle of Pakosław on 20 May 1915.

As commander of the Puławy Legion, there was distrust between Polish and Russian commanders. After recovery from his wounds, he was sent to another unit and served in the Petrograd garrison. During his time, he suffered a head injury and was hospitalized in a military hospital. He died as a result of a fall and buried in a Petrograd cemetery.

== Personal life ==
Reutt was married to Leonilda Cherkasówna. They five children; daughters: Zofia, Maria, married Piotrowska (died in Sopot on 13 November 1983) and Helena, married Tymieniecka, who before World War II appeared on the Polish Radio in Katowice during a children's program as "Aunt Hela", as well as two sons, of whom Pawet died in Sopot in the 1970s.

== Awards ==
- Cross of Valour – posthumously, 1922
- Cross of Merit – posthumously, 1926
- Cross of Independence – posthumously, 20 July 1932, honored for Polish independence

== Bibliography ==
- Bagiński, Henryk (1921). Wojsko Polskie na Wschodzie 1914-1920. Warszawa: Wojskowy Instytut Naukowo-Wydawniczy.
- Wrzosek, Mieczysław (1990). Polski czyn zbrojny podczas pierwszej wojny światowej 1914-1918. Warszawa: Państwowe Wydawnictwo „Wiedza Powszechna”. ISBN 83-214-0724-2.
- Wrzosek, Mieczysław. "Antoni Reutt (1861–1917)". Internetowy Polski Słownik Biograficzny.
