= Kalinowo, Ełk County =

Kalinowo
- Village
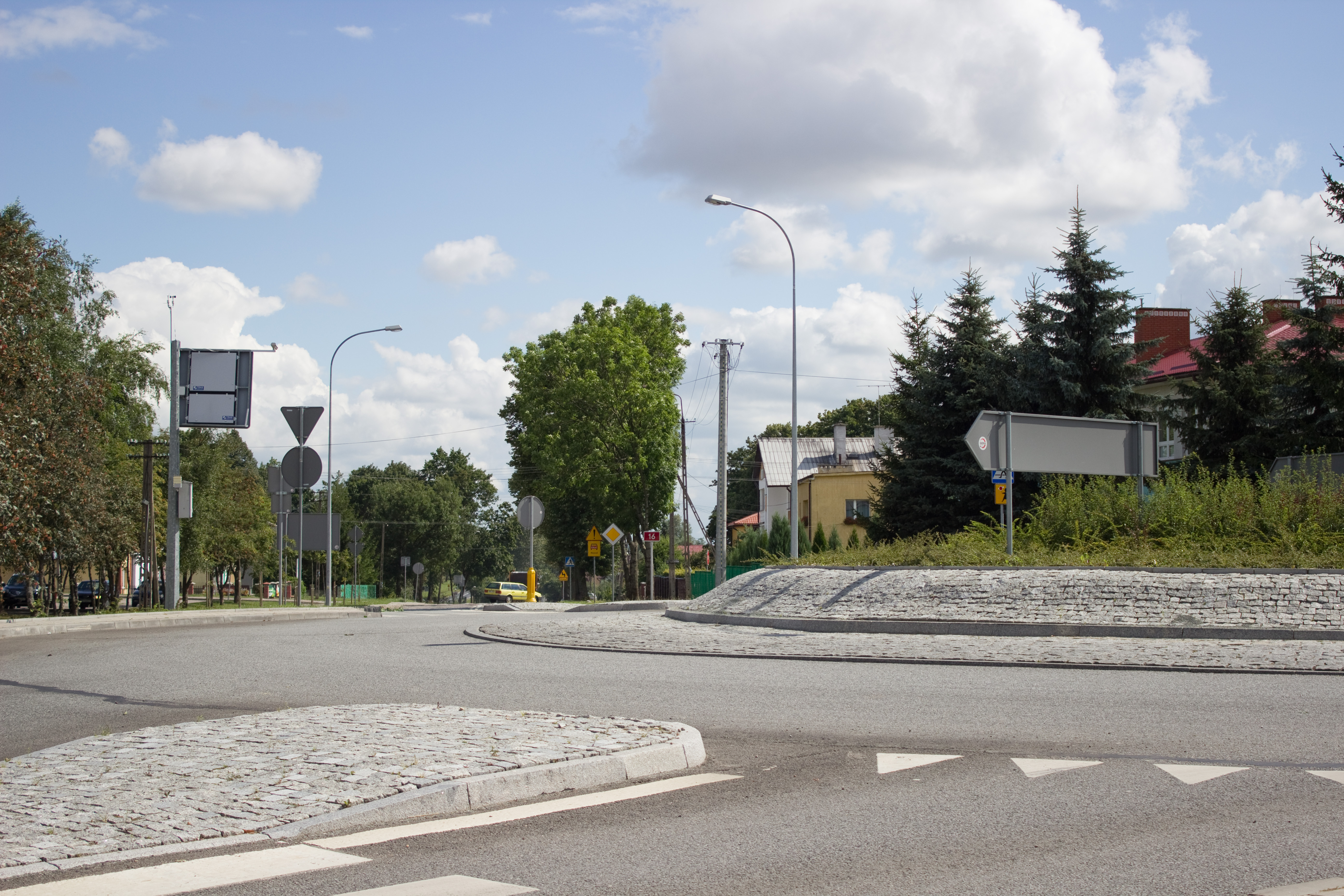

- Coat of arms

- Location within Poland
- Coordinates: 53°52′25″N 22°40′18″E
- Country: Poland
- Voivodeship: Warmian-Masurian
- County: Ełk
- Gmina: Kalinowo
- Population: 750

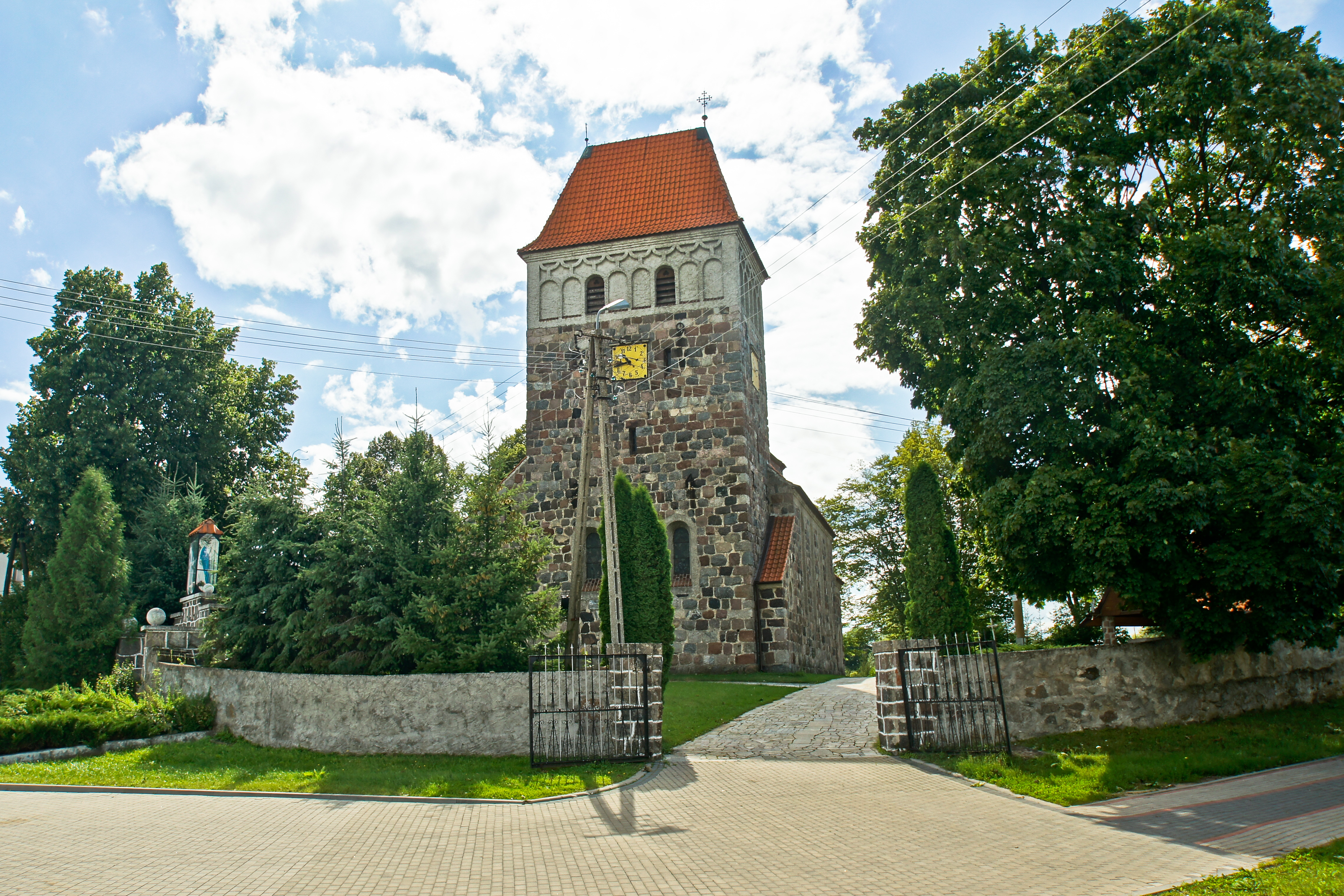
Church of the Assumption in Kalinowo.

Kalinowo [kaliˈnɔvɔ] is a village in Ełk County, Warmian-Masurian Voivodeship, in northern Poland. It is the seat of the gmina (administrative district) called Gmina Kalinowo.
