= Dorsze, Ełk County =

Village in Warmian-Masurian Voivodeship, Poland

Dorsze
- Village
- Location within Poland
- Coordinates: 53°55′55″N 22°37′50″E
- Country: Poland
- Voivodeship: Warmian-Masurian
- County: Ełk
- Gmina: Kalinowo
- Population: 100

Dorsze [ˈdɔrʂɛ] is a village in the administrative district of Gmina Kalinowo, within Ełk County, Warmian-Masurian Voivodeship, in northern Poland.

== Notable residents ==
- Elfriede Mohneke (1922-1994), Nazi concentration camp guard
