= Jan Rządkowski =

Polish general

General Jan Rządkowski
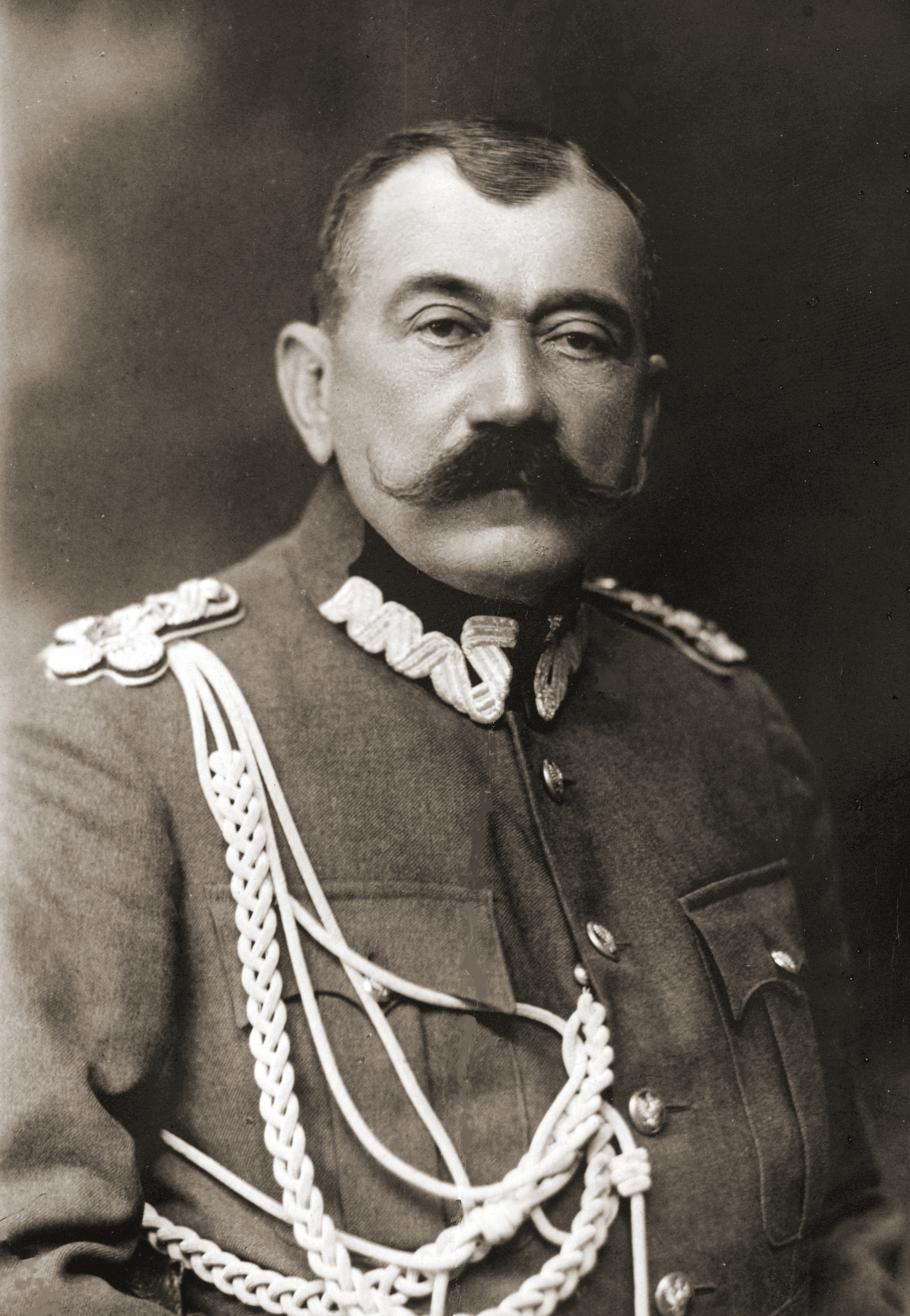
- Born: 14 July 1860; Belsk Duży, Warsaw Governorate, Congress Poland, Russian Empire
- Died: 17 February 1934 (aged 73); Suchorzew, Poland
- Military career
- Service years: From 1880 (Russian Empire); From 1918 (Poland)
- Rank: General
- Unit: 1st Lithuanian-Belarusian Division
- Conflicts: World War I Polish–Soviet War
- Other work: Writer

Jan Piotr Rządkowski (1860–1934) was a Polish military officer and a General of the Polish Army. He is best known as the commanding officer of the 1st Lithuanian-Belarusian Division during the Polish-Bolshevik War and then the commander of the armed forces of the Republic of Central Lithuania.

== Biography ==
Rządkowski was born on 14 July 1860 in Belsk Duży in the Warsaw Governorate of Congress Poland, to an old gentry family owning a number of villages and manors in the area of Łomża. Originating from the regions of Podlaskie and Kurpie, following the November Uprising the family was forced to move to central Poland, where Rządkowski was born. After he received basic education at the local gymnasium, at the age of 20 he joined the Russian Imperial Army. He quickly rose through its ranks and after the outbreak of the Great War he was among the highest-ranking Polish officers serving in that force. Because of that in 1915 the tsar nominated him to the post of the commanding officer of the Puławy Legion and then the Polish Rifle Brigade, the first entirely-Polish units formed in Russia since the January Uprising half a century before.

Rządkowski was a skilled commander, but also had to become a politician in order to convince Nicholas II to extend the Polish formations fighting alongside the Russian Army. His efforts mostly failed, but on the insistence of France the Blue Army was formed and the Polish units in Russia were also created. In 1917 Rządkowski became the commanding officer of the Polish Rifle Division and then the deputy commander of the Polish 2nd Rifle Division (pl) of the Polish I Corps.

In November 1918 Rządkowski joined the recreated Polish Army. In 1919 he became the regional commander of the Lublin Military Area, then involved in the final stages of the Polish-Ukrainian War and the opening stages of the Polish-Bolshevik War. Promoted to the rank of Lieutenant General, he became the commanding officer of the 1st Lithuanian-Belarusian Division, a unit formed mostly of Poles living in the areas broadly referred to as Kresy. With that division, he successfully opposed the Russian tactical assaults along the Upper Berezina river.

As the commander of that unit he took part in Gen. Lucjan Żeligowski's take-over of the city of Vilna and was briefly the commander of the armed forces of the Republic of Central Lithuania. However, as he was born outside of the area of the republic and had no civil rights there, he was called off to Poland and in 1921 became the commanding officer of the Łódź Military Area. As one of the senior officers, he was also the head of the Officers' Tribunal. In 1923 he was retired, promoted to the rank of generał broni and settled in the manor of Suchorzew in Greater Poland. He died there on 17 February 1934 and was buried in the Alley of Merit at the Warsaw's Powązki Cemetery.

== Honours and awards ==
Among his awards were the Silver Cross of the Virtuti Militari, Commander's Cross of the Polonia Restituta, four Crosses of Valour (Krzyż Walecznych) and the French Legion of Honour, Class III.

== See also ==
- Lithuanian and Belarusian Self-Defence
