= Elfriede Mohneke =

- Born: 2 March 1922; Dorschen, East Prussia, Weimar Republic
- Died: December 11, 1994 (aged 72); Berlin, Germany
- Status: Deceased
- Conviction: War crimes
- Trial: Hamburg Ravensbrück trials
- Penalty: 10 years imprisonment

Elfriede Hildegard Mohneke (born 2 March 1922, Dorschen, East Prussia, Germany (present-day Dorsze, Ełk, Poland) – died 11 December 1994, Berlin, Germany) was a guard at two Nazi concentration camps in World War II.

On 12 October 1944, Mohneke arrived at Ravensbrück concentration camp to begin overseer training under Dorothea Binz. In November 1944, the SS sent her as an Aufseherin to the Uckermark camp down the road from Ravensbrück. Mohneke served in the camp until the Allied liberation in April 1945.

At the third Ravensbrück Trial, the former SS woman was sentenced to ten years in prison for the maltreatment of concentration camp prisoners. In her appeal against the sentence, she claimed she was sent to Ravensbrück against her will by a mandatory call for duty from the labour office. She was released on 14 June 1952 for good conduct after serving only four years of her sentence. On 31 May 1968 she was questioned by Berlin police about another perpetrator that they were trying to trace.
