= Łoje, Ełk County =

Łoje
- Village
- Location within Poland
- Coordinates: 53°49′N 22°32′E
- Country: Poland
- Voivodeship: Warmian-Masurian
- County: Ełk
- Gmina: Kalinowo
- Time zone: UTC+1 (CET)
  - Summer (DST): UTC+2 (CEST)
- Vehicle registration: NEL

Łoje [ˈwɔjɛ] is a village in the administrative district of Gmina Kalinowo, within Ełk County, Warmian-Masurian Voivodeship, in northern Poland. It is situated in the historic region of Masuria, on the shore of Selmęt Wielki Lake.

== History ==
The village was founded by Polish settlers. In 1504, brothers Michał and Maciej Łoj were granted 7,5 włókas of land.
