= Piętki =

- Village
- Location within Poland
- Coordinates: 53°53′N 22°40′E
- Country: Poland
- Voivodeship: Warmian-Masurian
- County: Ełk
- Gmina: Kalinowo
- Founded: 1539
- Time zone: UTC+1 (CET)
  - Summer (DST): UTC+2 (CEST)
- Vehicle registration: NEL

Piętki [ˈpjɛntki] is a village in the administrative district of Gmina Kalinowo, within Ełk County, Warmian-Masurian Voivodeship, in northern Poland. It is located in the historic region of Masuria.

== History ==
The origins of the village date back to 1539, when several Polish settlers, among whom were named Michał and Pietrasz Jan, were granted 15 włókas of land to establish a village. It was an ethnically Polish village. Under Germany, in 1926, the village was renamed Blumental to erase traces of Polish origin. Following World War II, in 1945, it became again part of Poland, and its historic Polish name was restored.
