= Lisewo, Warmian-Masurian Voivodeship =

Lisewo
- Village
- Location within Poland
- Coordinates: 53°46′N 22°40′E
- Country: Poland
- Voivodeship: Warmian-Masurian
- County: Ełk
- Gmina: Kalinowo

Lisewo [liˈsɛvɔ] is a village in the administrative district of Gmina Kalinowo, within Ełk County, Warmian-Masurian Voivodeship, in northern Poland.
