= Mazurowo =

- Village
- Location within Poland
- Coordinates: 53°50′N 22°35′E
- Country: Poland
- Voivodeship: Warmian-Masurian
- County: Ełk
- Gmina: Kalinowo

Mazurowo [mazuˈrɔvɔ] is a village in the administrative district of Gmina Kalinowo, within Ełk County, Warmian-Masurian Voivodeship, in northern Poland.
