= Pisanica, Gmina Kalinowo =

Pisanica
- Village
- Location within Poland
- Coordinates: 53°49′N 22°35′E
- Country: Poland
- Voivodeship: Warmian-Masurian
- County: Ełk
- Gmina: Kalinowo
- Population: 3,000

Pisanica [pisaˈnit͡sa] is a village in the administrative district of Gmina Kalinowo, within Ełk County, Warmian-Masurian Voivodeship, in northern Poland.
