= Czyńcze =

- Village
- Location within Poland
- Coordinates: 53°48′26″N 22°35′45″E
- Country: Poland
- Voivodeship: Warmian-Masurian
- County: Ełk
- Gmina: Kalinowo
- Population: 60

Czyńcze [ˈt͡ʂɨɲt͡ʂɛ] is a village in the administrative district of Gmina Kalinowo, within Ełk County, Warmian-Masurian Voivodeship, in northern Poland.
