= Zanie, Warmian-Masurian Voivodeship =

Zanie
- Village
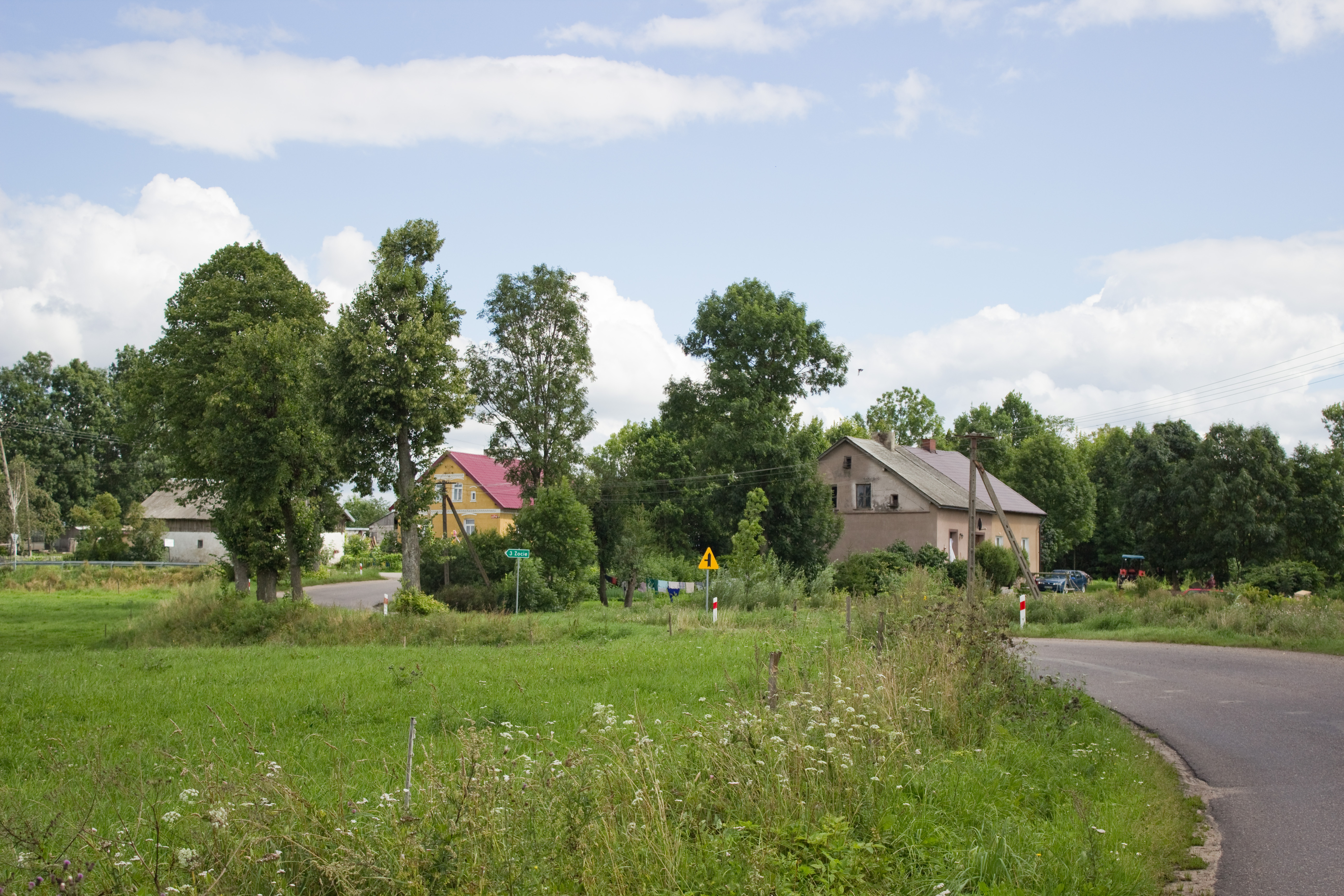

- Location within Poland
- Coordinates: 53°55′N 22°43′E
- Country: Poland
- Voivodeship: Warmian-Masurian
- County: Ełk
- Gmina: Kalinowo

Population
  - Total: 140
- Time zone: UTC+1 (CET)
  - Summer (DST): UTC+2 (CEST)
- Vehicle registration: NEL

Zanie [ˈzaɲɛ] is a village in the administrative district of Gmina Kalinowo, within Ełk County, Warmian-Masurian Voivodeship, in north-eastern Poland. It is located in the region of Masuria.

== History ==
The village was founded in 1472.

During World War II, on December 5, 1943, a unit of the Polish Home Army captured a German post in the village, killing its commander and seizing weapons, ammunition and a dozen sets of uniforms.

== Transport ==
The S61 highways bypasses Zanie in the south.
