= Romoty =

- Village
- Location within Poland
- Coordinates: 53°48′N 22°40′E
- Country: Poland
- Voivodeship: Warmian-Masurian
- County: Ełk
- Gmina: Kalinowo

Romoty [rɔˈmɔtɨ] is a village in the administrative district of Gmina Kalinowo, within Ełk County, Warmian-Masurian Voivodeship, in northern Poland.

== History ==
The village Romoty (German Romotten) was built around 1500. It belonged to the possession of the ancient noble family Gutowski, originating from northern Mazovia. The name Romoty is of Prussian origin and refers to a sanctuary of the once-based Baltic tribe, as pagan worship was held outdoors, in forests and on heathens (roms, rams: silent, quiet, devout).
