= Gmina Kalinowo =

Gmina Kalinowo Kalinowo Commune
- Gmina
- Coat of arms
- Interactive map of Gmina Kalinowo
- Coordinates (Kalinowo): 53°52′25″N 22°40′18″E
- Country: Poland
- Voivodeship: Warmian-Masurian
- County: Ełk
- Seat: Kalinowo

Area
  - Total: 285.17 km^{2} (110.10 sq mi)

Population (2011)
  - Total: 7,059
  - Density: 24.75/km^{2} (64.11/sq mi)
- Website: http://www.kalinowo.pl/

Gmina Kalinowo is a rural gmina (administrative district) in Ełk County, Warmian-Masurian Voivodeship, in northern Poland. Its seat is the village of Kalinowo, which lies approximately 22 kilometres (14 mi) east of Ełk and 144 km (89 mi) east of the regional capital Olsztyn.

The gmina covers an area of 285.17 square kilometres (110.1 sq mi), and as of 2006 its total population is 7,011 (7,059 in 2011).

== Villages ==
Gmina Kalinowo contains the villages and settlements of Borzymy, Czyńcze, Długie, Dorsze, Dudki, Ginie, Golubie, Golubka, Grądzkie Ełckie, Iwaśki, Jędrzejki, Kalinowo, Kile, Koleśniki, Krzyżewo, Kucze, Kulesze, Laski Małe, Laski Wielkie, Lisewo, Łoje, Makosieje, Marcinowo, Maże, Mazurowo, Mikołajki, Milewo, Piętki, Pisanica, Prawdziska, Romanowo, Romoty, Skomętno Wielkie, Skrzypki, Stacze, Stare Cimochy, Stożne, Sypitki, Szczudły, Turowo, Wierzbowo, Wysokie, Zaborowo, Zanie and Zocie.

== Neighbouring gminas ==
Gmina Kalinowo is bordered by the gminas of Augustów, Bargłów Kościelny, Ełk, Olecko, Prostki, Raczki, Rajgród and Wieliczki.
