= Kulesze, Warmian-Masurian Voivodeship =

Kulesze
- Village
- Location within Poland
- Coordinates: 53°51′N 22°36′E
- Country: Poland
- Voivodeship: Warmian-Masurian
- County: Ełk
- Gmina: Kalinowo

Kulesze [kuˈlɛʂɛ] is a village in the administrative district of Gmina Kalinowo, within Ełk County, Warmian-Masurian Voivodeship, in northern Poland.
