= Milewo, Warmian-Masurian Voivodeship =

Milewo
- Village
- Location within Poland
- Coordinates: 53°54′N 22°43′E
- Country: Poland
- Voivodeship: Warmian-Masurian
- County: Ełk
- Gmina: Kalinowo

Milewo [miˈlɛvɔ] is a village in the administrative district of Gmina Kalinowo, within Ełk County, Warmian-Masurian Voivodeship, in northern Poland.
