= Battle of Krechowce =

- Part of the Eastern Front during World War I
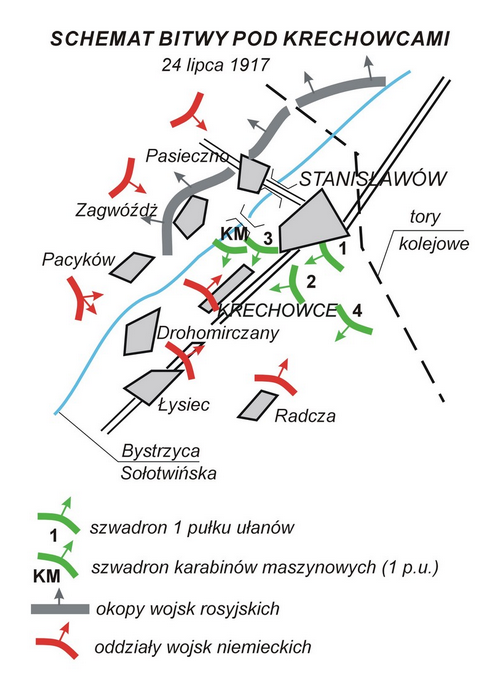
- Scheme of the Battle of Krechowce
Date	24 July 1917
Location	near Krechowce, Austria-Hungary
Result	See Aftermath

Belligerents
Russian Republic	(German Empire) Germany; Austria-Hungary

Commanders and leaders
(Russian Republic) Pavel Sytin (Russian Republic) Bolesław Mościcki	

Units involved
(Russian Republic) 1st Polish Uhlan Regiment	

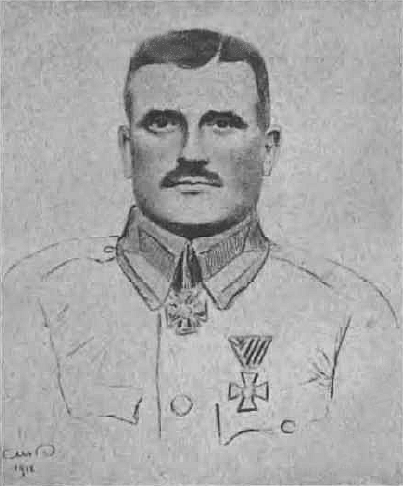
Colonel Bolesław Mościcki

The Battle of Krechowce (Polish: Bitwa pod Krechowcami) took place on 24 July 1917, during World War I. Polish uhlans of the Russian Army were ordered to halt Imperial German Army forces advancing on the city of Stanisławów, located in Galicia in Austria-Hungary. The battle between the Polish and German forces took place near the village of Krechowce (Ukrainian: Крихівці). The Polish uhlans managed to check the Germans for an entire day, then retreated to Stanisławów.

== Opening moves ==
On 21 July 1917, the Polish 1st Uhlan Regiment, a force of 400 soldiers which was part of the Russian Army's Puławy Legion, entered Stanisławów, where it defended the civilian population from Russian marauders who were looting the city. The Russian 11th Infantry Division was located on the outskirts of Stanisławów, but another Russian unit ordered to defend the area to the south of the city, the 19th Infantry Division, did not take its positions, as most of its soldiers had fled.

The Russian Major General Pavel Sytin, who commanded the 11th Infantry Division, was well aware of the danger of encirclement from the south in the absence of the 19th Infantry Division and ordered his troops to prepare to retreat over bridges over two rivers east of Stanisławów, the Bystrytsia Solotvynska (Polish: Bystrzyca Sołotwińska, Ukrainian: Бистриця Солотвинська) and the Bystrytsia Nadvirnianska (Polish: Bystrzyca Nadwórniańska, Ukrainian: Бистриця Надвірнянська). In order to save most of his troops and artillery, Sytin ordered the 1st Uhlan Regiment to protect the retreat and check the Germans for as long as possible.

Colonel Bolesław Mościcki, who commanded the regiment, split his forces into two groups, which, due to the hilly terrain, were not in contact with each other. Furthermore, he decided to attack the enemy with his troops mounted. He ordered his 4th Squadron to protect the road from Radzcza to Stanisławów, his 2nd Squadron to attack the village of Krechowce, and his 3rd Squadron to advance behind the 2nd Squadron. His 1st Squadron formed his reserve.

== Battle ==
On 24 July 1917 at 3:30 p.m., the Polish forces, reinforced by a Russian armored vehicle, went into action. Bavarian infantry, supported by artillery and an armored vehicle, defended Krechowce. After Polish soldiers reached the center of the village, superior German firepower forced them to retreat. Soldiers of the 2nd and 3rd Squadrons then dismounted and awaited action. Mościcki sent a few patrols into Krechowce, simulating another attack.

Meanwhile, a battalion of the Russian 41st Infantry Regiment arrived to support the Polish uhlans while the bulk of the Russian 11th Infantry Division crossed the two bridges, which the Poles then blew up. Mościcki's 4th Squadron, operating east of Stanisławów, at some point met two squadrons of German cavalry. The Germans retreated, and the Poles, while in pursuit, found themselves under heavy fire from infantry in the village of Drohomirczany. To save the situation, Mościcki's 1st Squadron joined the 4th Squadron, and the two squadrons drove the enemy infantry — which turned out to be a Bosnian unit in Austro-Hungarian Army service — out of Drohomirczany.

Mościcki's patrols returned from Krechowce at about 8 p.m., providing him with information about German reinforcements which had appeared in the village. Before nightfall, all Polish forces were ordered to retreat to a location south of Stanisławów.

== Aftermath ==
Facing an overwhelmingly superior enemy force and without artillery support of its own, the 400 soldiers of the lst Uhlan Regiment checked the advance of 2,000 Germans for five hours, allowing the Russian 11th Infantry Division to avoid encirclement and withdraw. Although the Battle of Krechowce was not important from a strategic point of view, and did not significantly affect the events of World War I, it became legendary among Poles. The 1st Uhlan Regiment became known as the 1st Krechowce Uhlan Regiment, and the battle was commemorated with the inscription “KRECHOWCE 24 VII 1917” on the Tomb of the Unknown Soldier in Warsaw. The inscription was removed by Polish Communist Party authorities of the Polish People's Republic, but after the Third Polish Republic was established in 1989, the inscription was restored after 1990.

== Sources ==
- Andrzej Suchcitz Dzieje 1 Pułku Ułanów Krechowieckich 1941-1947 wyd. Veritas Foundation Publication Centra. Londyn 2002 ISBN 0-948202-99-8.
- Aleksander Wojciechowski 1 Pułk Ułanów Krechowieckich (z cyklu Zarys historii wojennej pułków polskich 1918-1920) wyd. Warszawa 1929.
- Jan Litewski, Władysław Dziewanowski Dzieje 1-go Pułku Ułanów Krechowieckich (pamięci poległych oficerów i ułanów pułku) wyd. Wojskowe Biuro Historyczne, Warszawa 1932
- Bolesław Jan Kukiełka Teki B.J. Kukiełki (Materiały do dziejów 1 Pułku Ułanów Krechowieckich), Londyn 1985

== See also ==
- 1st Krechowce Uhlan Regiment
