= Pakosław, Masovian Voivodeship =

Pakosław
- Village
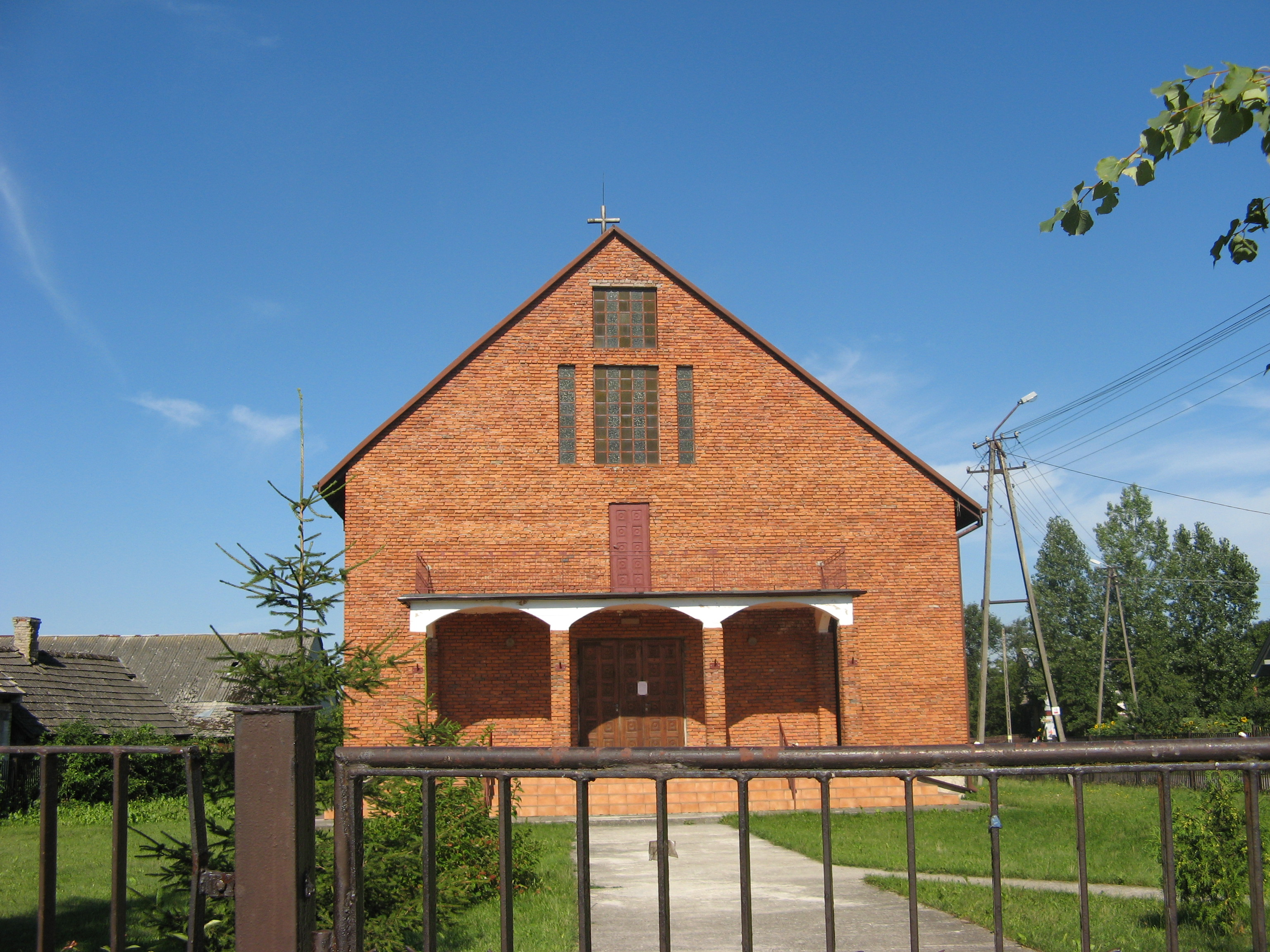
- Church of Saint Maksymilian Kolbe

- Location within Poland
- Coordinates: 51°11′30″N 21°10′32″E
- Country: Poland
- Voivodeship: Masovian
- County: Radom
- Gmina: Iłża

Population
  - Total: 975

Pakosław [paˈkɔswaf] is a village in the administrative district of Gmina Iłża, within Radom County, Masovian Voivodeship, in east-central Poland.
