= Mikołajki, Ełk County =

Mikołajki
- Village
- Location within Poland
- Coordinates: 53°53′N 22°34′E
- Country: Poland
- Voivodeship: Warmian-Masurian
- County: Ełk
- Gmina: Kalinowo

Mikołajki [mikɔˈwai̯ki] is a village in the administrative district of Gmina Kalinowo, within Ełk County, Warmian-Masurian Voivodeship, in northern Poland.
