= Dudki, Ełk County =

Dudki
- Village
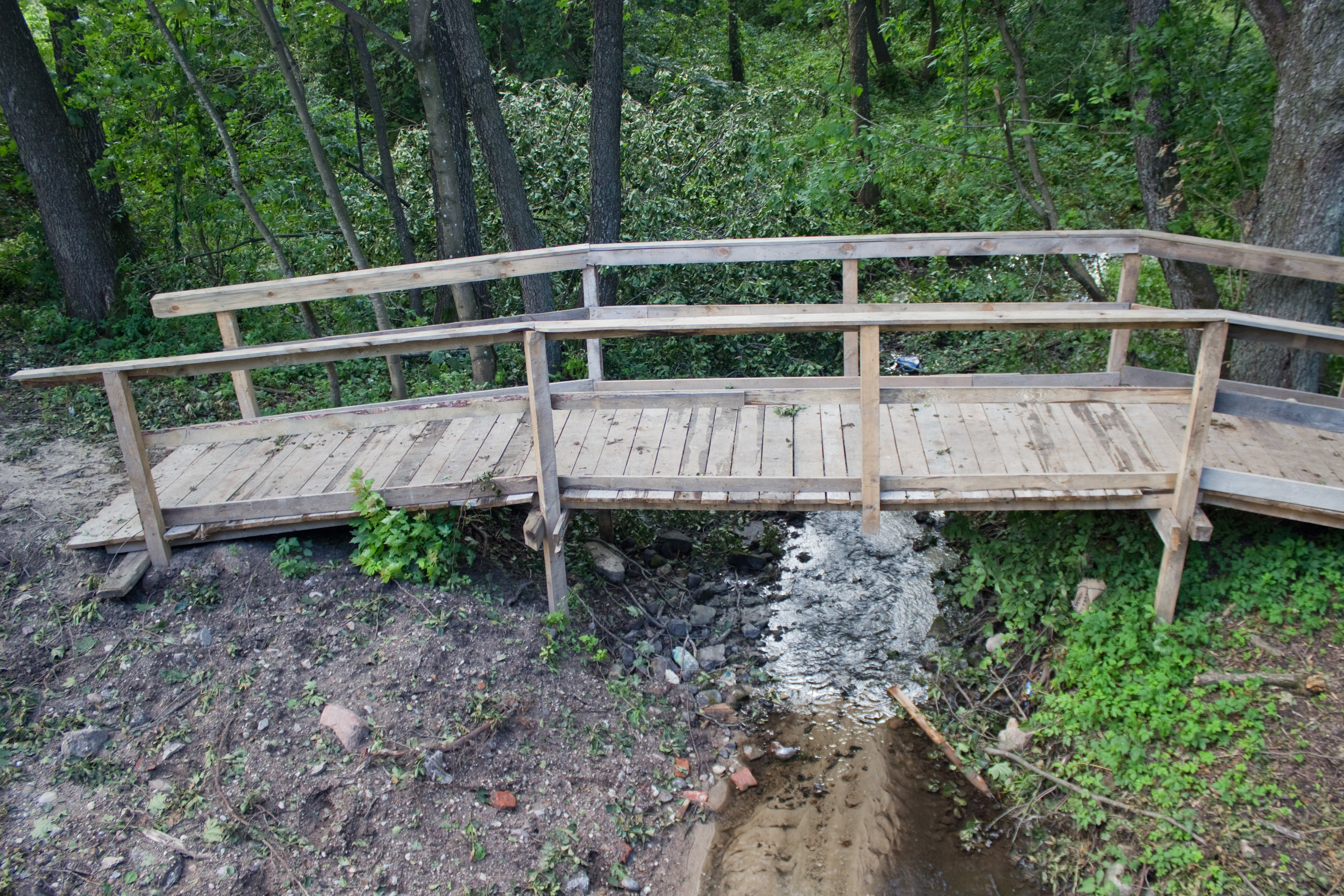

- Location within Poland
- Coordinates: 53°50′03″N 22°41′06″E
- Country: Poland
- Voivodeship: Warmian-Masurian
- County: Ełk
- Gmina: Kalinowo

Dudki [ˈdutki] is a village in the administrative district of Gmina Kalinowo, within Ełk County, Warmian-Masurian Voivodeship, in northern Poland.
