= Puławy Legion =

Polish military unit of the Imperial Russian Army

- Legion Puławski; Легион Пулави
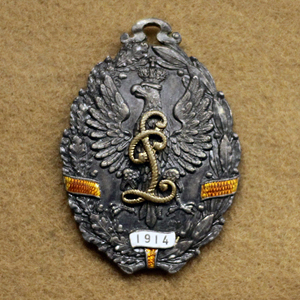
- Cap Badge
- Active: 30 November 1914 – 5 February 1915
- Country: Russian Empire
- Branch: Imperial Russian Army
- Size: ~1,000 (January 1915)
- Engagements: World War I: Battle of Pakosław

Commanders
- Notable commanders: Antoni Reutt; Jan Rządkowski

Puławy Legion (Polish: Legion Puławski, Russian: Легион Пулави) was a Polish military formation of World War I as part of the Imperial Russian Army.

It was created in late 1914 from volunteers gathered together due to several initiatives, most notably of which was that of the pro-Russian Polish National Committee, supported by Polish National Democrats. The initiative was supposed to counteract the Polish Legions of Józef Piłsudski forming under the Austro–Hungarian Army. The formation finished organizing in January 1915; at that time it numbered about 1,000 soldiers, and constituted a battalion of the Russian Army. The formation was used in combat against the German Empire. Eventually, the Legion was disbanded in October 1915 and reorganized into the Polish Rifle Brigade.

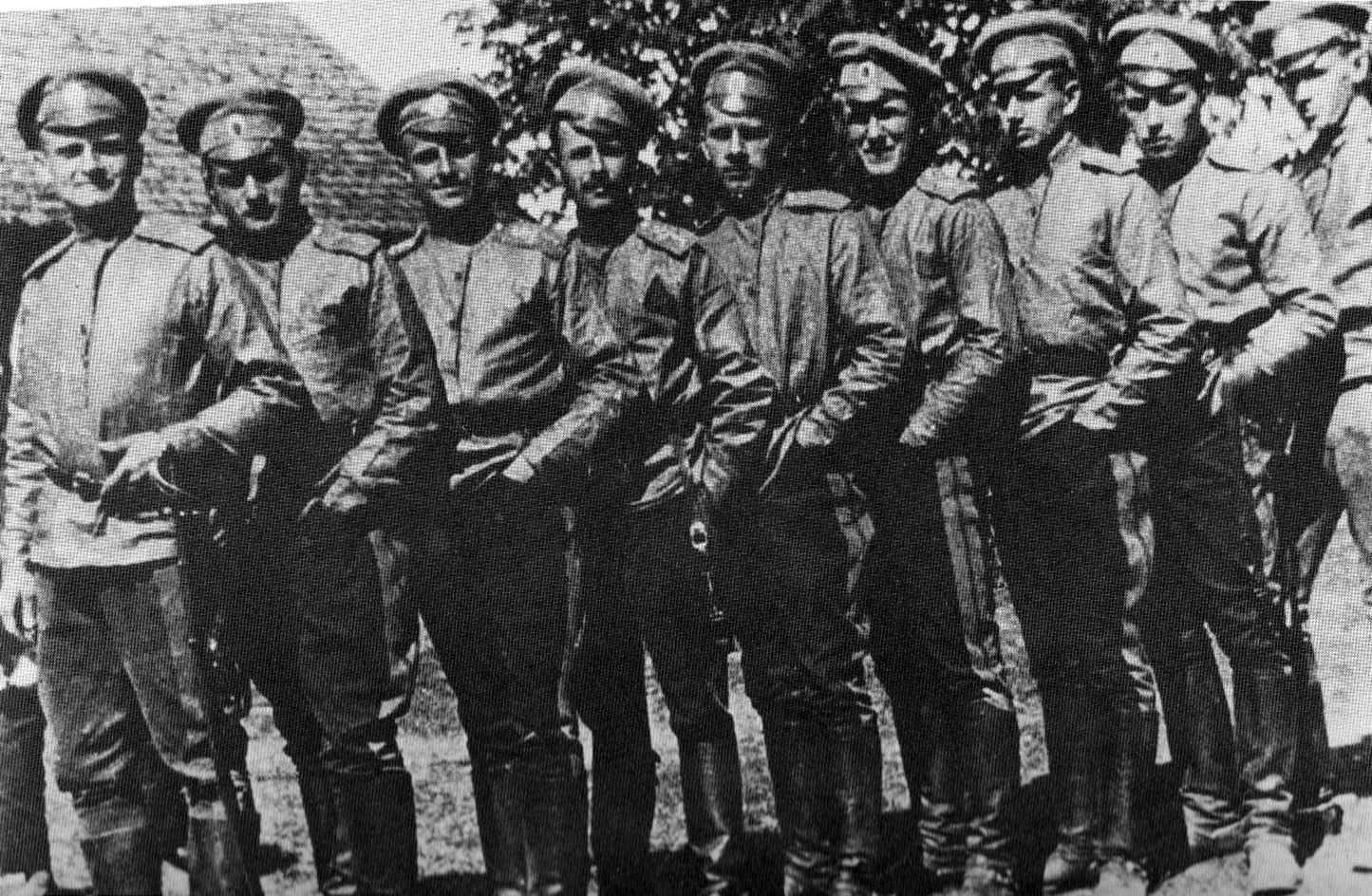
Officers of the Puławy Legion

== History ==
=== Background ===
In 1795 Poland was partitioned between the Kingdom of Prussia, the Austrian and Russian Empires. In 1914, with the onset of World War I, those powers found themselves on separate sides, and all tried to recruit Poles into their ranks, promising increased autonomy after the war in return.

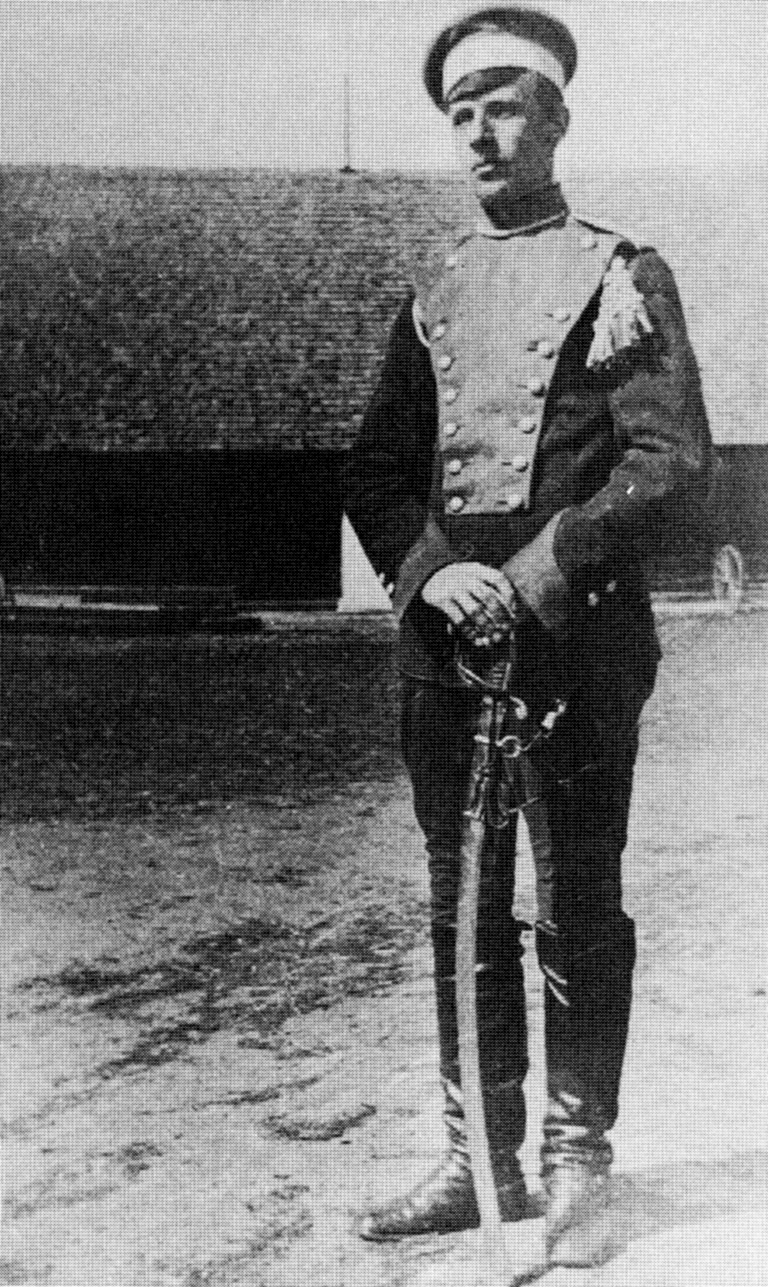
An uhlan of the Puławy Legion

=== Formation ===
In the Russian Empire, efforts of Witold Ostoja-Gorczyński, supported by the command of the Southwestern Front, resulted in a growing group of Polish volunteers gathering from October and November 1914 first at Chełm and Brest, and later at Puławy. This initiative, supported by the Polish National Democrats, was also aimed at countering the (eventually more successful) initiative of Józef Piłsudski, who was forming his own Polish Legions under the supervision of the Austro-Hungarian Army.

The organization of the formation was delayed due to logistical problems. In January 1915 Polish National Committee threw its support behind the initiative, and colonel Antoni Reutt was nominated for the organization's commander. As the numbers of volunteers were growing, a second legion was created in Lublin (the Lublin Legion). A cavalry formation was also being created. The formation was officially known as the Polish Legion(s), and was subordinate to the 59th Defence Brigade of General Piotr Szymanowski.

=== Organisation ===
By January 1915 the Legion has finished organizing, at that time numbering about 1,000 volunteers; an equivalent of an Imperial Russian Army infantry battalion (in February it would be divided into four companies). It was however still plagued by logistical problems (for example, it did not receive the promised artillery, and the machine guns it received were captured Austrian ones – without ammunition). There were also problems with the transfer of volunteers from other Russian Imperial formations (requests were commonly denied), and the project to recruit volunteers from Polish prisoners of war from the Austro-Hungarian Army was refused.

On 5 February 1915, the Legions were reorganized as 'Narodnoe Opolcheniye' units:

- the Puławy Legion into the 739th Novo Aleksandrovo Militia Battalion,
- the Lublin Legion into the 740th Lublin Militia Battalion.

The Puławy Legion was deployed to the frontlines on 20 March 1915; at that time it was taken out from under general Szymanowski and was assigned to the Moscow Grenadier Corps under general Mrozowski. The Lublin Legion was never deployed to the frontlines, instead it was used to replenish the losses of the Puławy Legion. The formation was to be used in combat against the German Empire, but morale was affected by the rumors it would be used against Austria-Hungary and its Polish Legions.

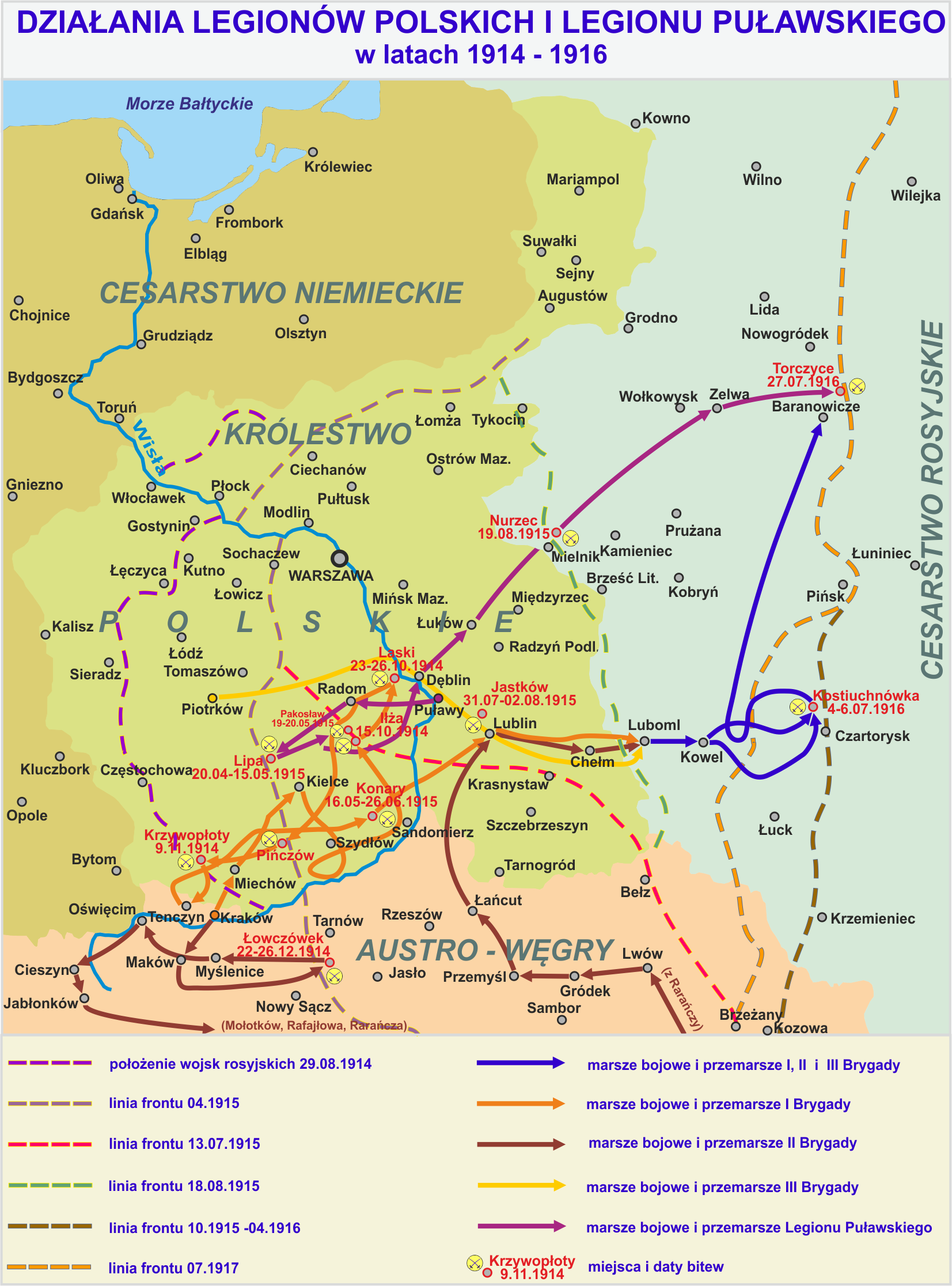
Operations of the Polish Legions (including the Puławy Legion)

== Battles ==
The formation fought in several battles:

- 19 May – at Pakosław (where colonel Reutt was injured, and the command passed to colonel Jan Rządkowski)
- 16 June – at Michałów (or Michałowo)
- 17 July – at Władysławowo
- 21 July – at Kolonia Chechelska
- 22 July – at Puławska Góra
- 14 August – at Karczowka
- 20 August – at Nurzec
- 23 August – at Opaka
- 5 September – at Izabelin
- 9 September – at Zelwa

During that period, the Legion sustained heavy casualties – 415 dead and 1,016 wounded (92% of its initial numbers).

Eventually, the Legion was disbanded in October 1915; some troops joined the newly forming Polish Rifle Brigade (Polish: Brygada Strzelców Polskich). The reorganization was a result of efforts by Colonel Rządkowaski and others aiming at increasing the size of the Polish forces in the Russian Army.

== Commanders ==
- Lieutenant Colonel Antoni Reutt – from 17 January 1915
- Colonel Jan Rządkowski – from 19 May 1915

== See also ==
- Polish I Corps in Russia
- Polish II Corps in Russia
- 1st Krechowce Uhlan Regiment
