= Małgorzata Kopiczko =

Polish politician (born 1967)

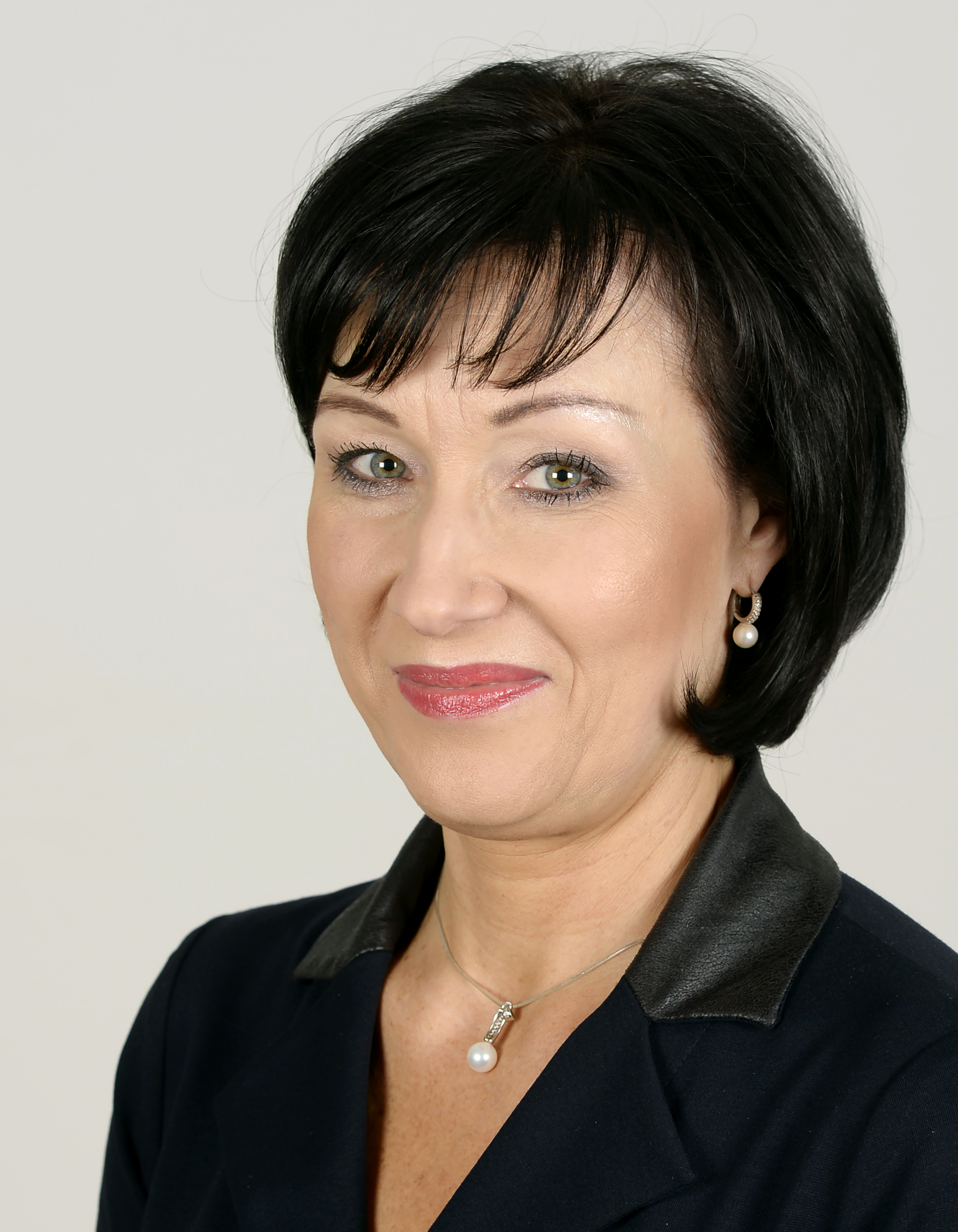
- Kopiczko in 2015

Member of the Senate of Poland

Personal details
- Born: 18 January 1967 (age 59)

Małgorzata Kopiczko (born 18 January 1967) is a Polish politician. She was elected to the Senate of Poland (10th term) representing the constituency of Olsztyn.

== Career ==
She is a graduate of the Faculty of Pedagogy of the University of Warsaw (she studied at the University of Warsaw branch in Białystok). She completed postgraduates studies in Polish philology, educational management, and career counseling. She worked as a teacher, and in 2012, received a doctorate in education. She was the principal of a primary school in Chełchy, Ełk County, and became principal of Primary School No. 2 in Ełk in 2007.

Between 1998–2006, Kopiczko was a member of the Ełk County council. In 2006, she ran for the position of mayor of Gmina Ełk as an independent politician, with the nomination of the Electoral Committee of Voters for the Common Good, and measured 4th in number of votes, out of 7 candidates. Between 2010-2015, she was still on the county council, with the nomination of the Electoral Committee of Voters for the Common Good, and was simultaneously a member of the county board.

She was awarded the Bronze Cross of Merit in 2012. In the 2015 parliamentary elections, she was elected on behalf of the Law and Justice committee (as a non-partisan candidate recommended by Poland Together) and became a member of the 9th term of the Senate, representing the Ełk electoral district. On 1 April 2016, she announced that she was officially joining Law and Justice. In the 2019 parliamentary elections, she successfully ran for re-election to the Senate. She was a member of the board of the Foundation for the Development of the Education System. She was not reelected to the Senate in the 2023 parliamentary elections. In 2024, she was elected to the 7th term of the Warmian–Masurian Voivodeship Sejmik. In May of that year, she was appointed deputy mayor of Ełk County, losing her seat in the regional council.

== Personal life ==
She is married and has two daughters.
