= Koziki =

Koziki may refer to:

- Koziki, Masovian Voivodeship (north-east Poland)
- Koziki, Podlaskie Voivodeship (north-east Poland)
- Koziki, Warmian-Masurian Voivodeship (north-east Poland)
- Koziki, Vladimir Oblast (west Russia)

== See also ==
- Kojiki, an ancient Japanese book
