= Skup =

- Village
- Location within Poland
- Coordinates: 53°53′43″N 22°22′22″E
- Country: Poland
- Voivodeship: Warmian-Masurian
- County: Ełk
- Gmina: Ełk

Skup (Polish pronunciation: [skup]) is a village in the administrative district of Gmina Ełk, within Ełk County, Warmian-Masurian Voivodeship, in northern Poland.
