= Ełk (hamlet) =

- hamlet
- Location within Poland
- Coordinates: 53°48′9″N 22°20′7″E
- Country: Poland
- Voivodeship: Warmian-Masurian
- County: Ełk
- Gmina: Ełk

Ełk (earlier Ełk POHZ) (Note: POHZ stands for "Państwowy Ośrodek Hodowli Zarodowej", or State Pedigree Breeding Center (see pl:Organizacja hodowli zwierząt zarodowych (PRL))) is a hamlet (Polish: osada) in the administrative district of Gmina Ełk, within Ełk County, Warmian-Masurian Voivodeship, in northern Poland.
