= Piaski, Ełk County =

Piaski
- Village
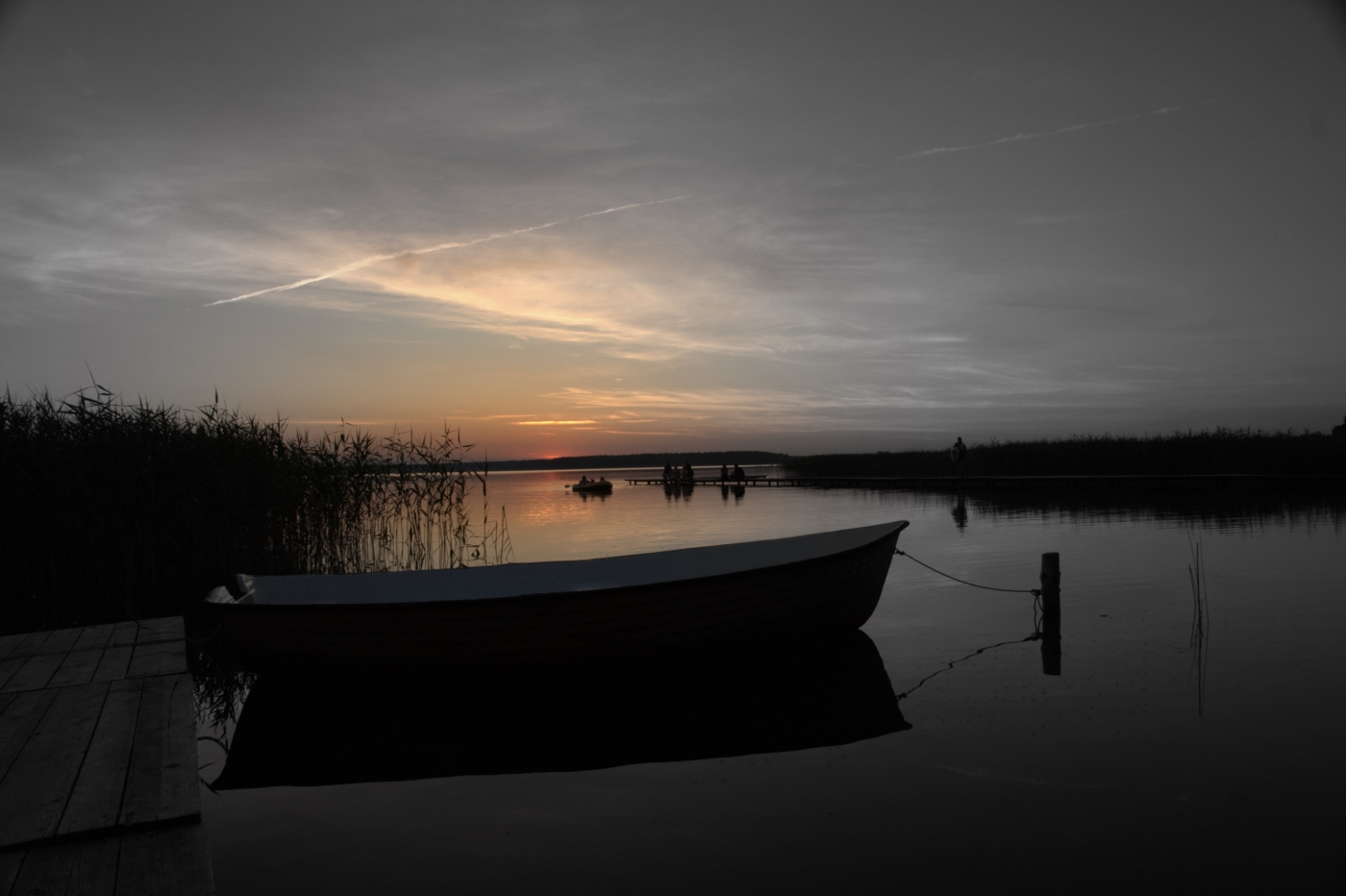

- Location within Poland
- Coordinates: 53°55′N 22°19′E
- Country: Poland
- Voivodeship: Warmian-Masurian
- County: Ełk
- Gmina: Ełk
- Time zone: UTC+1 (CET)
  - Summer (DST): UTC+2 (CEST)
- Postal code: 19-325
- Vehicle registration: NEL

Piaski (Polish pronunciation: [ˈpjaskʲi]) is a village in the administrative district of Gmina Ełk, within Ełk County, Warmian-Masurian Voivodeship, in northern Poland. It is located in Masuria.
