= Malinówka Wielka =

- Village
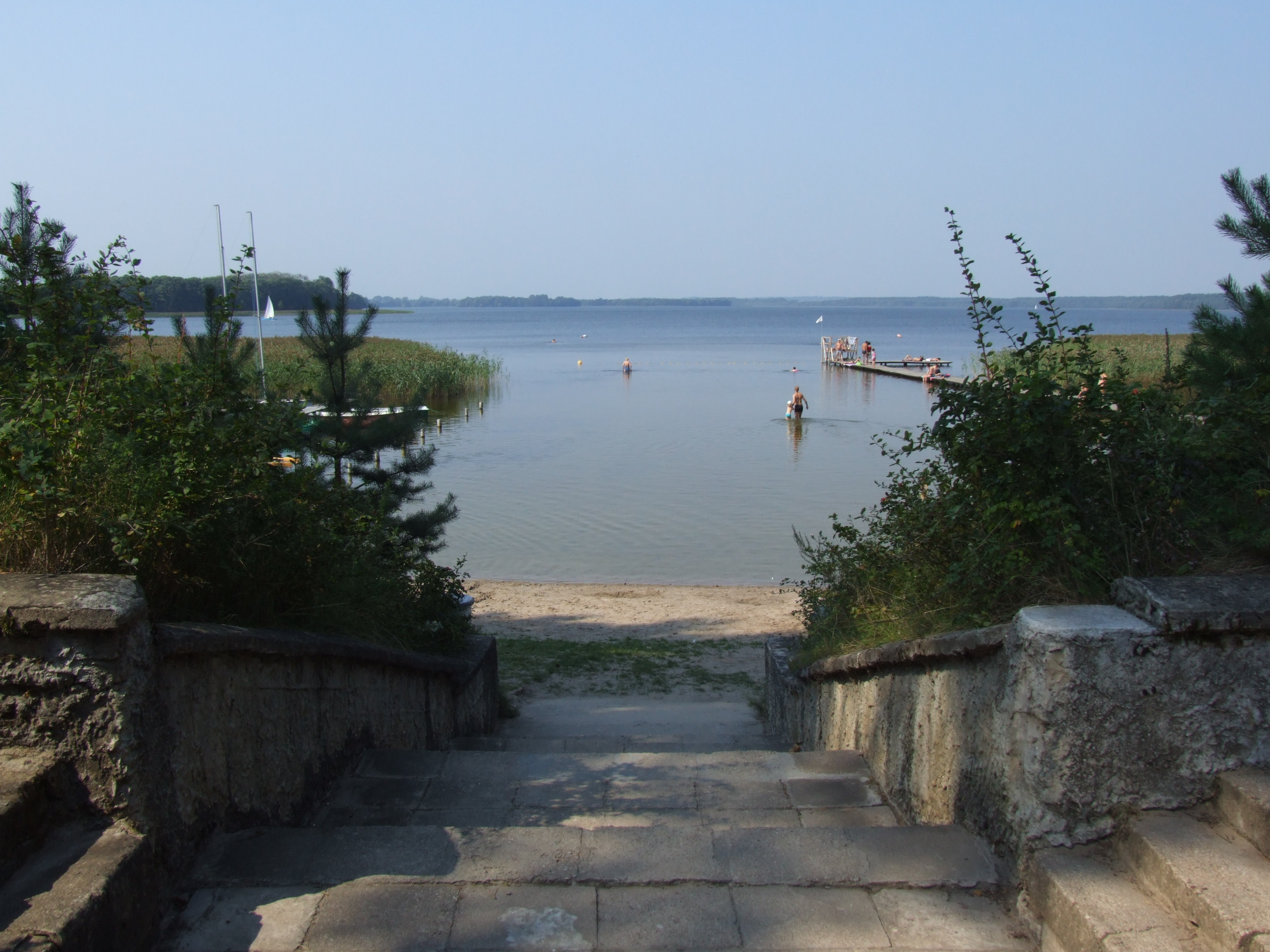
- Beach in Malinówka Wielka

- Location within Poland
- Coordinates: 53°54′N 22°19′E
- Country: Poland
- Voivodeship: Warmian-Masurian
- County: Ełk
- Gmina: Ełk
- Population: 54

Malinówka Wielka [maliˈnufka ˈvjɛlka] is a village in the administrative district of Gmina Ełk, within Ełk County, Warmian-Masurian Voivodeship, in northern Poland.
