= Lega, Warmian-Masurian Voivodeship =

Lega
- Village
- Location within Poland
- Coordinates: 53°51′23″N 22°27′54″E
- Country: Poland
- Voivodeship: Warmian-Masurian
- County: Ełk
- Gmina: Ełk

Lega [ˈlɛɡa] is a village in the administrative district of Gmina Ełk, within Ełk County, Warmian-Masurian Voivodeship, in northern Poland.
