= Przykopka =

- Village
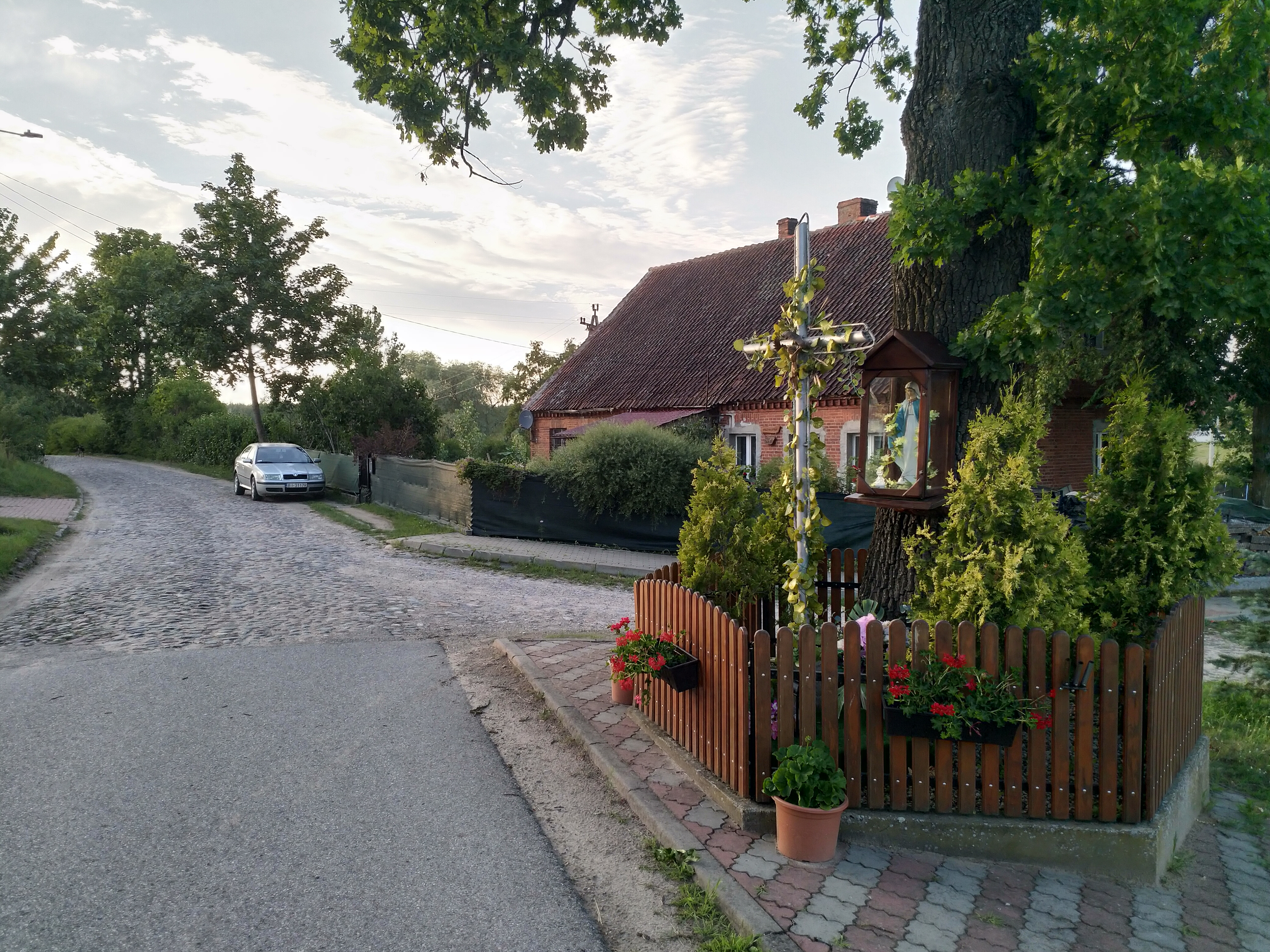

- Location within Poland
- Coordinates: 53°52′N 22°25′E
- Country: Poland
- Voivodeship: Warmian-Masurian
- County: Ełk
- Gmina: Ełk

Przykopka [pʂɨˈkɔpka] is a village in the administrative district of Gmina Ełk, within Ełk County, Warmian-Masurian Voivodeship, in northern Poland.
