= Konieczki, Warmian-Masurian Voivodeship =

Konieczki
- Village
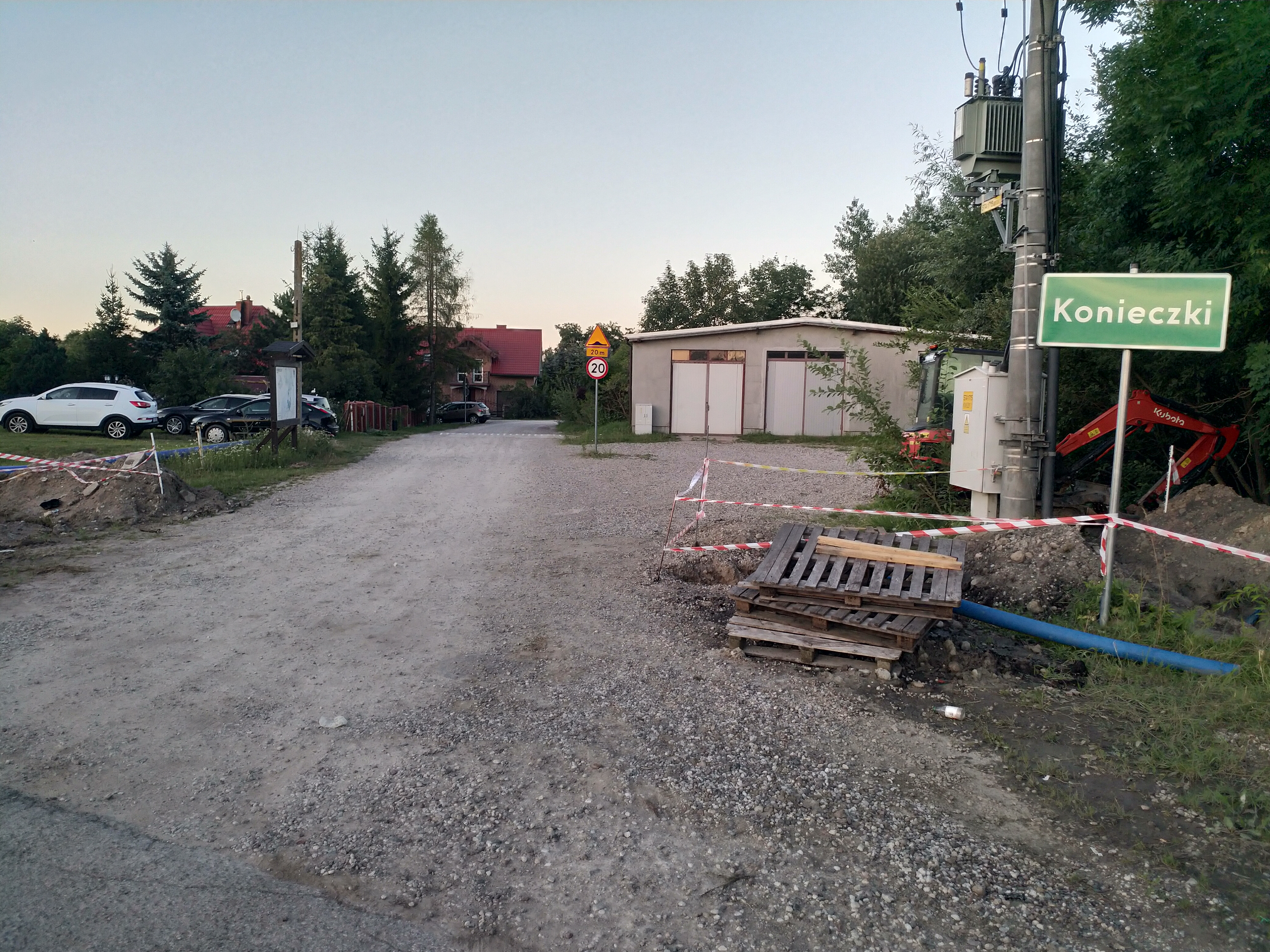

- Location within Poland
- Coordinates: 53°50′58.4″N 22°20′41.5″E
- Country: Poland
- Voivodeship: Warmian-Masurian
- County: Ełk
- Gmina: Ełk

Konieczki [kɔˈɲɛt͡ʂki] is a village in the administrative district of Gmina Ełk, within Ełk County, Warmian-Masurian Voivodeship, in northern Poland.
