= Mostołty =

- Village
- Location within Poland
- Coordinates: 53°46′N 22°14′E
- Country: Poland
- Voivodeship: Warmian-Masurian
- County: Ełk
- Gmina: Ełk

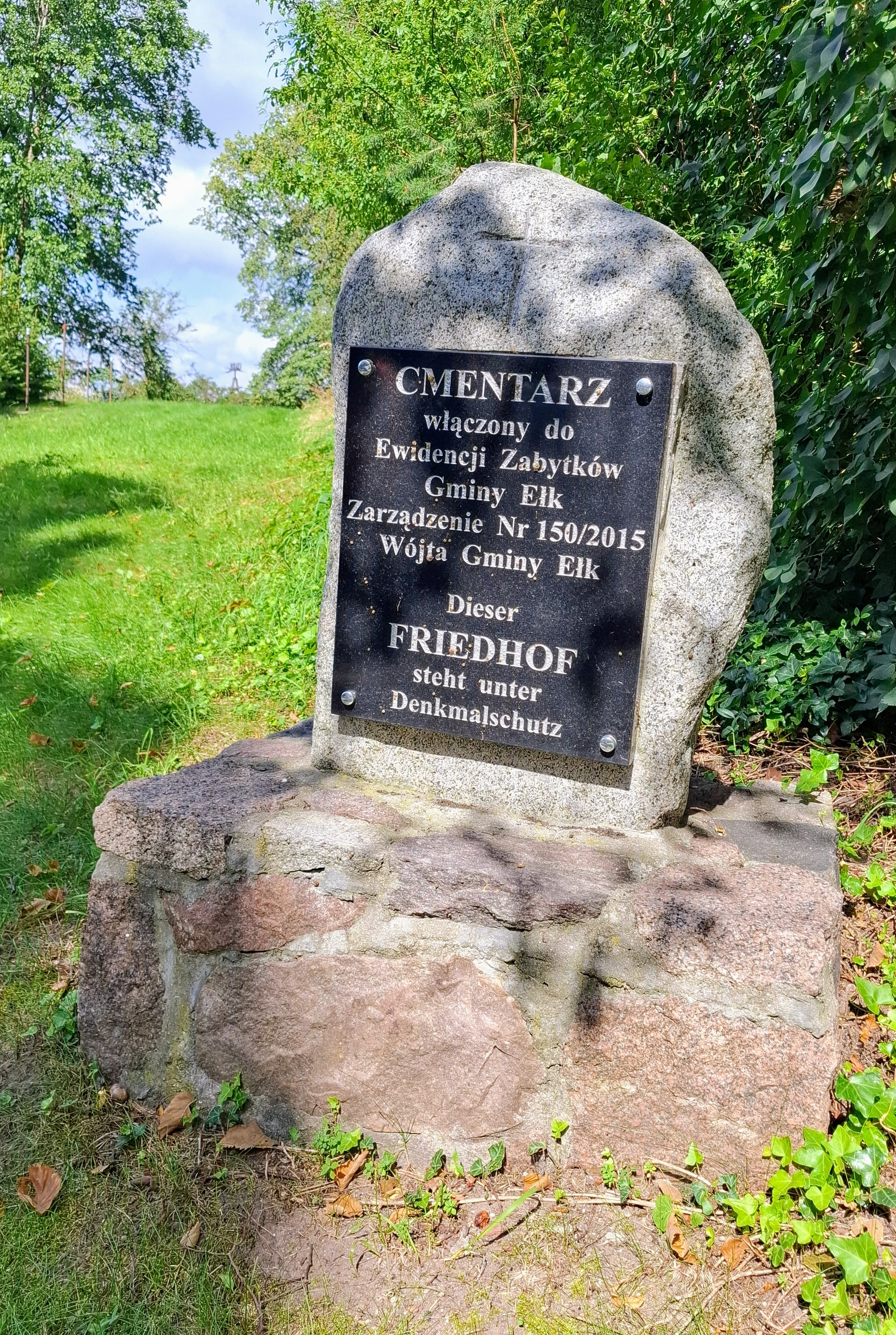
Entry to the graveyard

Mostołty [mɔsˈtɔu̯tɨ] is a village in the administrative district of Gmina Ełk, within Ełk County, Warmian-Masurian Voivodeship, in northern Poland.
