= Miluki =

- Settlement
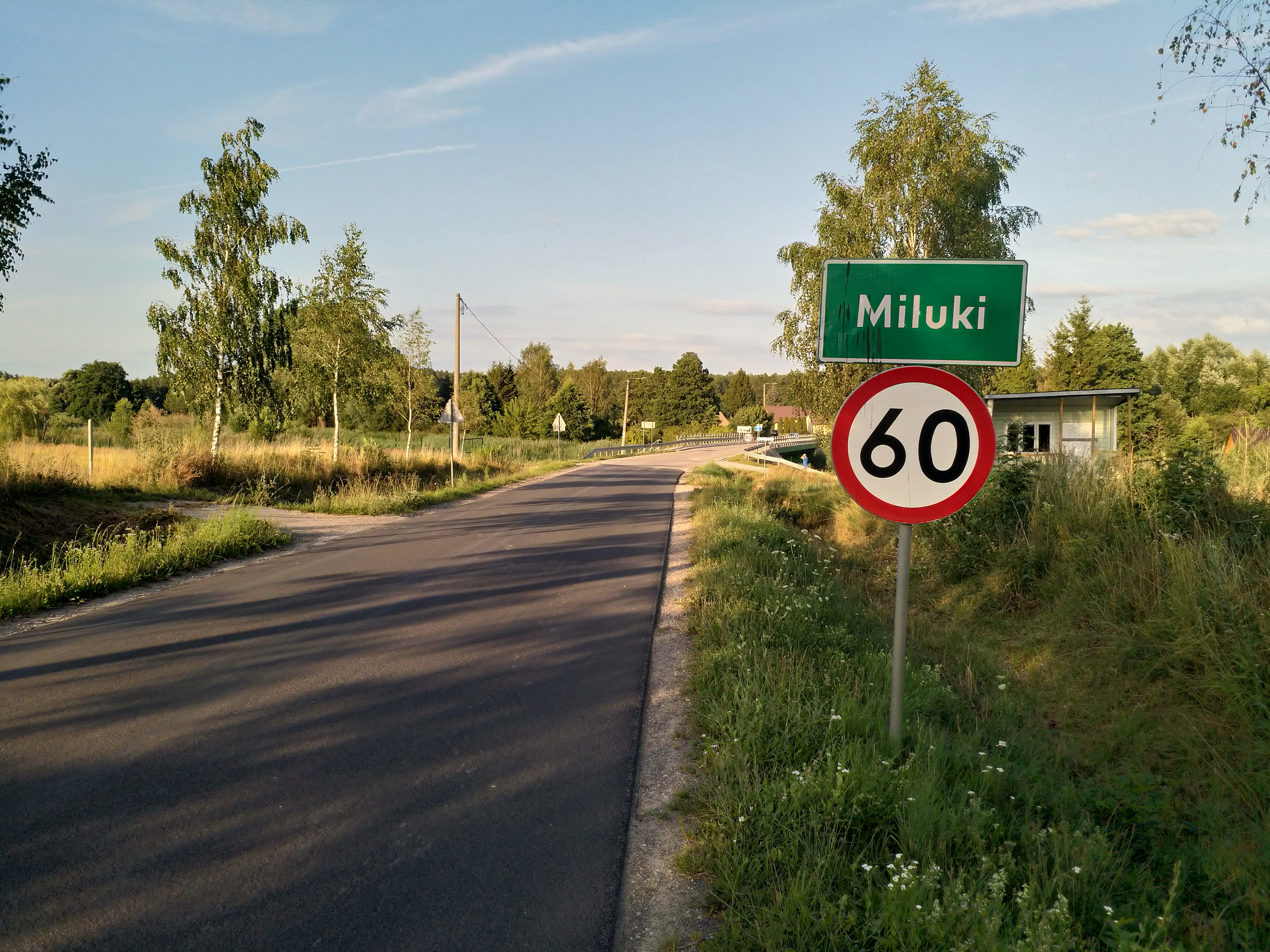

- Location within Poland
- Coordinates: 53°52′35″N 22°22′23″E
- Country: Poland
- Voivodeship: Warmian-Masurian
- County: Ełk
- Gmina: Ełk

Miluki [miˈluki] is a settlement in the administrative district of Gmina Ełk, within Ełk County, Warmian-Masurian Voivodeship, in northern Poland.
