= Niekrasy =

- Village
- Location within Poland
- Coordinates: 53°44′10″N 22°18′0″E
- Country: Poland
- Voivodeship: Warmian-Masurian
- County: Ełk
- Gmina: Ełk
- Population: 30

Niekrasy [ɲɛˈkrasɨ] is a village in the administrative district of Gmina Ełk, within Ełk County, Warmian-Masurian Voivodeship, in northern Poland.
