= Janisze, Warmian-Masurian Voivodeship =

Janisze
- Village

- Location within Poland
- Coordinates: 53°54′27″N 22°21′54″E
- Country: Poland
- Voivodeship: Warmian-Masurian
- County: Ełk
- Gmina: Ełk

Janisze [jaˈniʂɛ] is a village in the administrative district of Gmina Ełk, within Ełk County, Warmian-Masurian Voivodeship, in northern Poland.
