= Rożyńsk =

- Village
- Location within Poland
- Coordinates: 53°49′27″N 22°9′57″E
- Country: Poland
- Voivodeship: Warmian-Masurian
- County: Ełk
- Gmina: Ełk
- Population: 180

Rożyńsk (Polish pronunciation: [ˈrɔʐɨj̃sk]) is a village in the administrative district of Gmina Ełk, within Ełk County, Warmian-Masurian Voivodeship, in northern Poland.

== Climate ==
Rożyńsk has a humid continental climate. It is characterized by cold winters and fairly warm summers. The Köppen Climate Classification subtype for this climate is "Dfb". (Warm Summer Continental Climate).

Climate data for Rożyńsk
Month	Jan	Feb	Mar	Apr	May	Jun	Jul	Aug	Sep	Oct	Nov	Dec	Year
Record high °C (°F)	9.6 (49.3)	10.9 (51.6)	16.8 (62.2)	24.9 (76.8)	29.2 (84.6)	32.2 (90.0)	34.6 (94.3)	35.2 (95.4)	30.8 (87.4)	23.9 (75.0)	13.9 (57.0)	11.3 (52.3)	35.2 (95.4)
Mean daily maximum °C (°F)	−2.8 (27.0)	−2.5 (27.5)	2.1 (35.8)	10.2 (50.4)	18.5 (65.3)	20.6 (69.1)	22.4 (72.3)	21.4 (70.5)	16.4 (61.5)	11.8 (53.2)	4.0 (39.2)	−0.5 (31.1)	10.1 (50.2)
Daily mean °C (°F)	−4.7 (23.5)	−4.3 (24.3)	−0.5 (31.1)	6.0 (42.8)	12.9 (55.2)	15.2 (59.4)	17.2 (63.0)	16.1 (61.0)	11.8 (53.2)	6.9 (44.4)	1.3 (34.3)	−2.3 (27.9)	6.3 (43.3)
Mean daily minimum °C (°F)	−6.6 (20.1)	−6.1 (21.0)	−3.1 (26.4)	1.8 (35.2)	7.3 (45.1)	9.8 (49.6)	12.0 (53.6)	10.8 (51.4)	7.2 (45.0)	2.0 (35.6)	−1.4 (29.5)	−4.1 (24.6)	2.5 (36.5)
Record low °C (°F)	−30.6 (−23.1)	−30.3 (−22.5)	−28.8 (−19.8)	−12.3 (9.9)	−5.0 (23.0)	−1.5 (29.3)	1.7 (35.1)	0.4 (32.7)	−4.6 (23.7)	−14.2 (6.4)	−22.1 (−7.8)	−26.8 (−16.2)	−30.6 (−23.1)
Average precipitation mm (inches)	36 (1.4)	25 (1.0)	31 (1.2)	38 (1.5)	53 (2.1)	78 (3.1)	77 (3.0)	77 (3.0)	53 (2.1)	47 (1.9)	47 (1.9)	41 (1.6)	603 (23.7)
Average precipitation days	15	13	15	12	12	14	15	14	13	16	15	15	169
Average relative humidity (%)	85	85	85	82	77	77	79	80	80	82	85	86	82
Mean monthly sunshine hours	35	53	92	153	219	225	222	212	150	89	46	32	1,528
Source 1: http://www.imigw.pl
Source 2: https://www.stat.gov.pl/cps/rde/xchg/gus
