= Bienie =

- Village
- Location within Poland
- Coordinates: 53°51′N 22°15′E
- Country: Poland
- Voivodeship: Warmian-Masurian
- County: Ełk
- Gmina: Ełk

Bienie [ˈbjɛɲɛ] is a village in the administrative district of Gmina Ełk, within Ełk County, Warmian-Masurian Voivodeship, in northern Poland.
