= Płociczno, Warmian-Masurian Voivodeship =

Płociczno
- Village
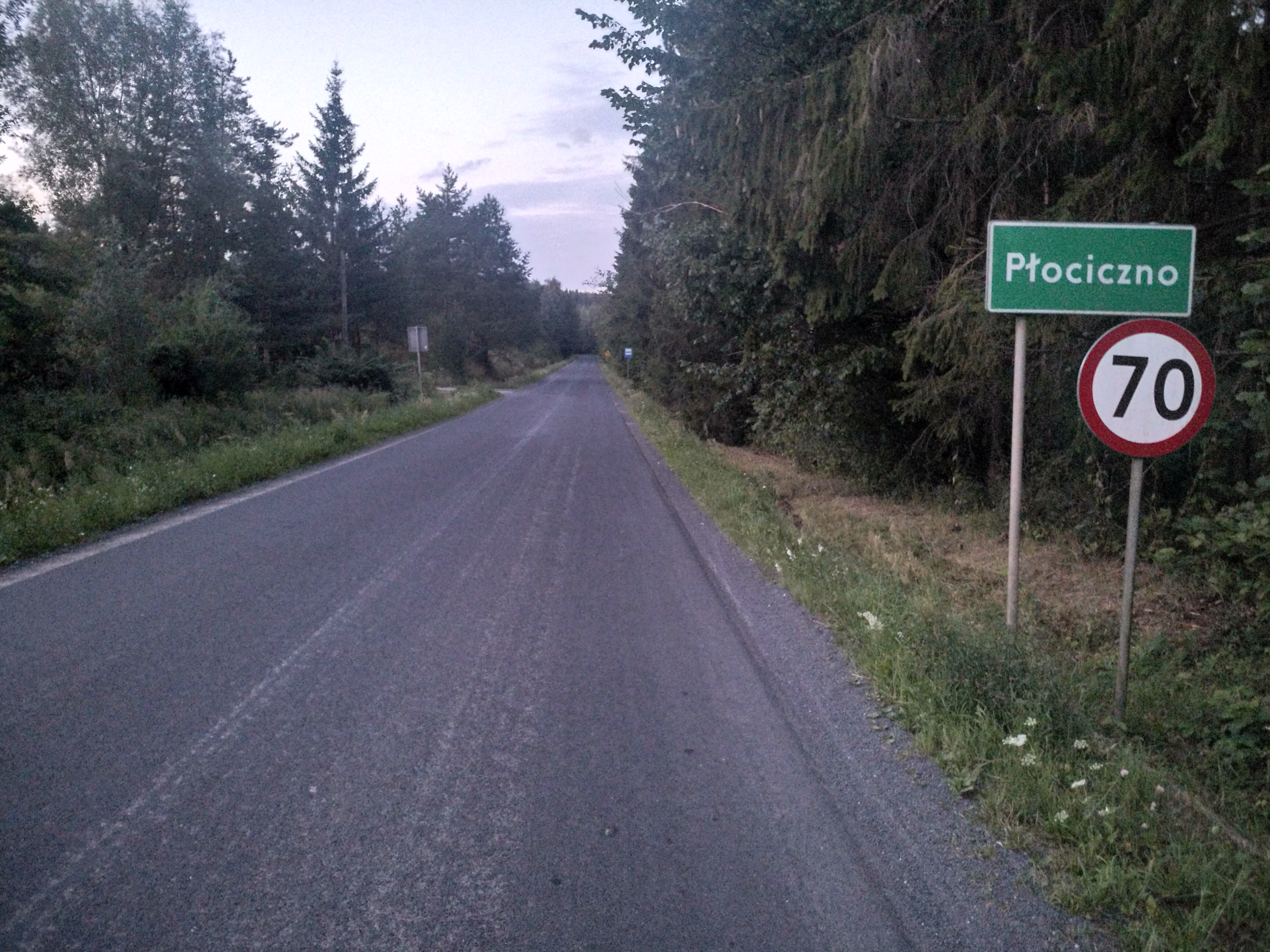

- Location within Poland
- Coordinates: 53°53′N 22°24′E
- Country: Poland
- Voivodeship: Warmian-Masurian
- County: Ełk
- Gmina: Ełk
- Population: 90

Płociczno [pwɔˈt͡ɕit͡ʂnɔ] is a village in the administrative district of Gmina Ełk, within Ełk County, Warmian-Masurian Voivodeship, in northern Poland.
