= Bartosze =

- Village
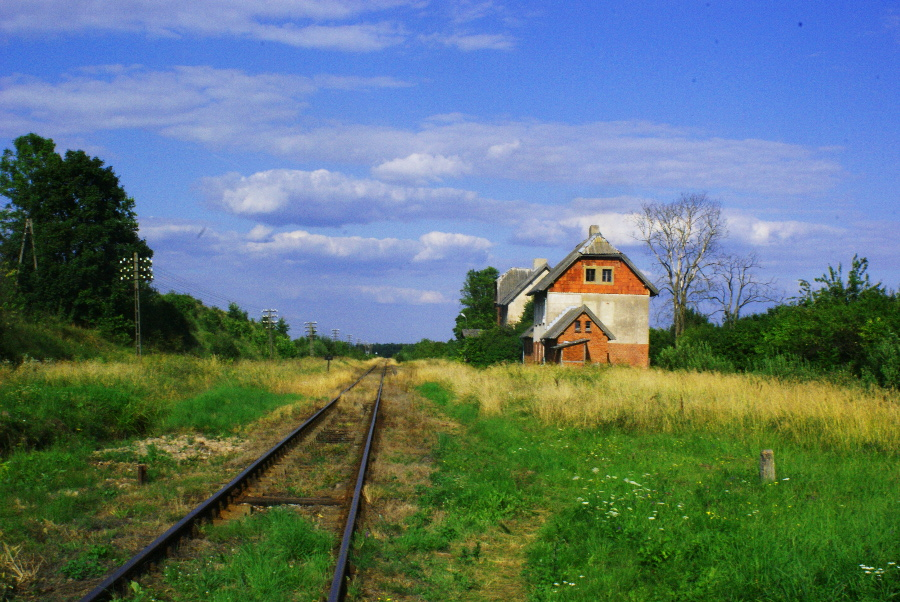

- Location within Poland
- Coordinates: 53°50′N 22°16′E
- Country: Poland
- Voivodeship: Warmian-Masurian
- County: Ełk
- Gmina: Ełk
- Population: 190

Bartosze [barˈtɔʂɛ] is a village in the administrative district of Gmina Ełk, within Ełk County, Warmian-Masurian Voivodeship, in northern Poland.
