= Przytuły =

Przytuły may refer to the following places:

- Przytuły, Masovian Voivodeship (east-central Poland)
- Przytuły, Podlaskie Voivodeship (north-east Poland)
- Przytuły, Ełk County in Warmian-Masurian Voivodeship (north Poland)
- Przytuły, Olecko County in Warmian-Masurian Voivodeship (north Poland)
- Przytuły, Szczytno County in Warmian-Masurian Voivodeship (north Poland)
- Przytuły, Węgorzewo County in Warmian-Masurian Voivodeship (north Poland)
