= Judziki =

Judziki may refer to the following places:

- Judziki, Podlaskie Voivodeship (north-east Poland)
- Judziki, Ełk County in Warmian-Masurian Voivodeship (north Poland)
- Judziki, Olecko County in Warmian-Masurian Voivodeship (north Poland)
