= Buniaki =

- Village
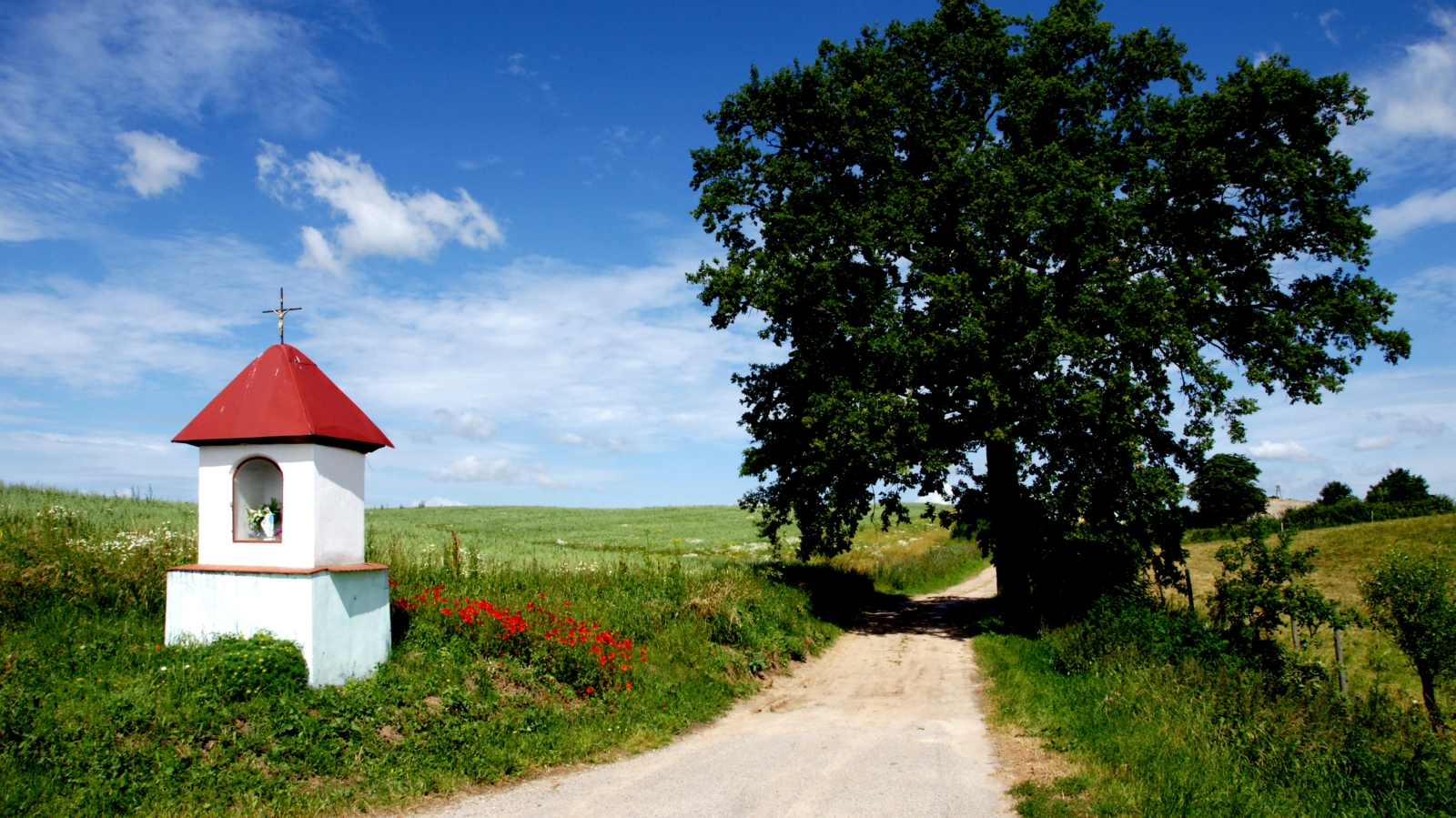
- Buniaki

- Location within Poland
- Coordinates: 53°48′40″N 22°16′5″E
- Country: Poland
- Voivodeship: Warmian-Masurian
- County: Ełk
- Gmina: Ełk

Buniaki [buˈɲaki] is a village in the administrative district of Gmina Ełk, within Ełk County, Warmian-Masurian Voivodeship, in northern Poland.
