= Czaple, Warmian-Masurian Voivodeship =

Czaple
- Village
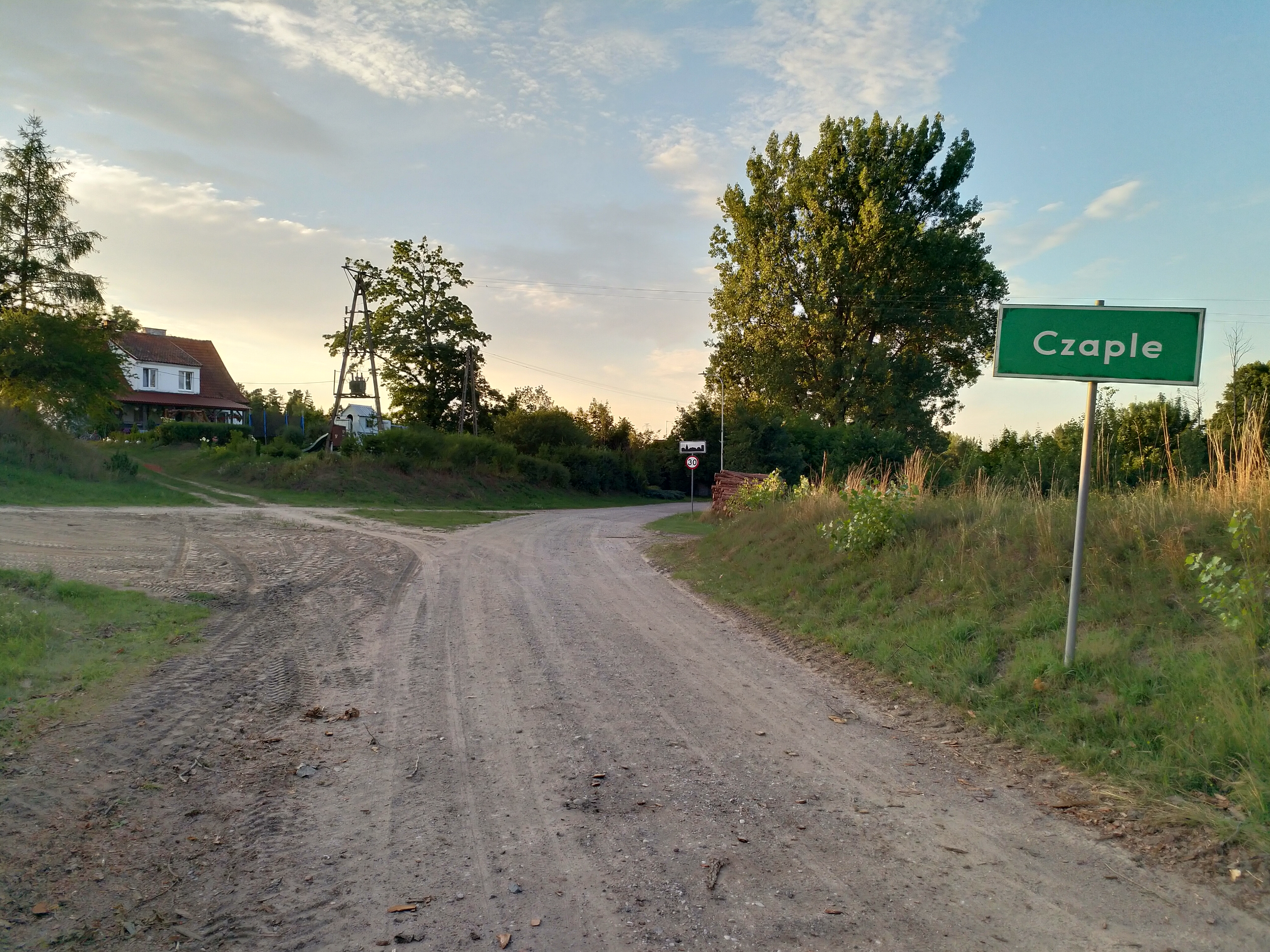
- Czaple (2024)

- Location within Poland
- Coordinates: 53°53′48″N 22°27′26″E
- Country: Poland
- Voivodeship: Warmian-Masurian
- County: Ełk
- Gmina: Ełk

Czaple [ˈt͡ʂaplɛ] is a village in the administrative district of Gmina Ełk, within Ełk County, Warmian-Masurian Voivodeship, in northern Poland.
