= Suczki, Ełk County =

Suczki
- Village
- Location within Poland
- Coordinates: 53°45′6″N 22°14′35″E
- Country: Poland
- Voivodeship: Warmian-Masurian
- County: Ełk
- Gmina: Ełk
- Population (approx.): 75
- Time zone: UTC+1 (CET)
  - Summer (DST): UTC+2 (CEST)
- Vehicle registration: NEL

Suczki [ˈsut͡ʂki] is a village in the administrative district of Gmina Ełk, within Ełk County, Warmian-Masurian Voivodeship, in north-eastern Poland. It is located on the western shore of Lake Bajtkowskie in the region of Masuria.

The village was founded by Poles in 1484 or earlier.
