= Sędki, Warmian-Masurian Voivodeship =

Sędki
- Village
- Location within Poland
- Coordinates: 53°51′N 22°29′E
- Country: Poland
- Voivodeship: Warmian-Masurian
- County: Ełk
- Gmina: Ełk

Sędki [ˈsɛntki] is a village in the administrative district of Gmina Ełk, within Ełk County, Warmian-Masurian Voivodeship, in northern Poland.

== Notable residents ==
- Horst Großmann (1891–1972), German general
