= Ruska Wieś =

Ruska Wieś may refer to the following places:

- Ruska Wieś, Lublin Voivodeship (east Poland)
- Ruska Wieś, Subcarpathian Voivodeship (south-east Poland)
- Ruska Wieś, Ełk County in Warmian-Masurian Voivodeship (north Poland)
- Ruska Wieś, Mrągowo County in Warmian-Masurian Voivodeship (north Poland)
- Ruska Wieś, Węgorzewo County in Warmian-Masurian Voivodeship (north Poland)
