= Straduny =

- Village
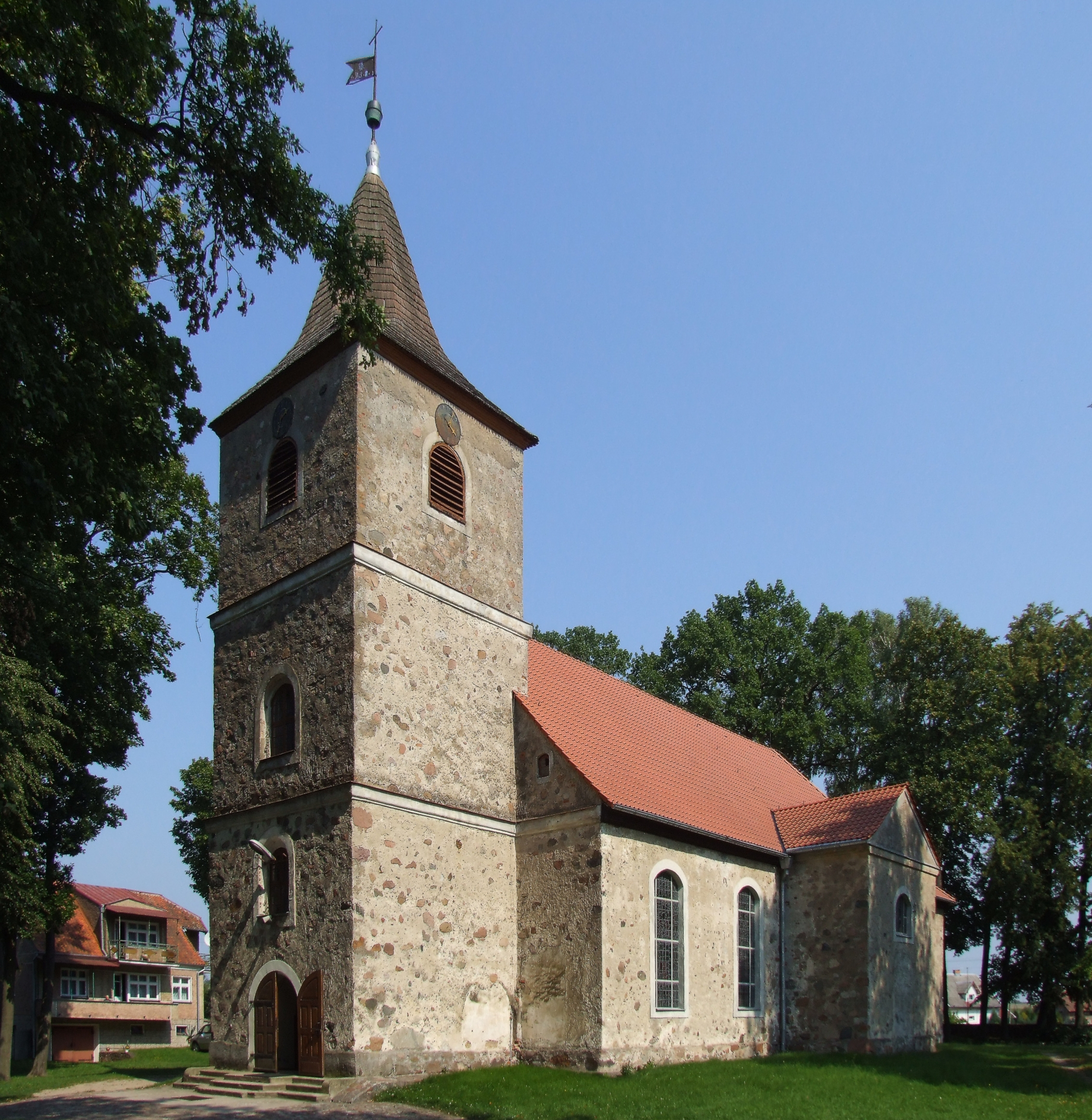
- Our Lady Queen of Poland church in Straduny

- Location within Poland
- Coordinates: 53°53′N 22°21′E
- Country: Poland
- Voivodeship: Warmian-Masurian
- County: Ełk
- Gmina: Ełk
- Population: 990
- Time zone: UTC+1 (CET)
  - Summer (DST): UTC+2 (CEST)
- Vehicle registration: NEL

Straduny [straˈdunɨ] is a village in the administrative district of Gmina Ełk, within Ełk County, Warmian-Masurian Voivodeship, in north-eastern Poland. It is situated on the Ełk River and Straduńskie Lake in Masuria. There are three nature reserves in the vicinity.

== History ==
Straduny was officially founded in 1475 when sołtys Jakub was granted 60 włókas of land by Bernhard von Balzhofen, Komtur of Brandenburg, to establish a village. It was then part of the monastic state of the Teutonic Knights within the Kingdom of Poland. The name is derived from the Latin strada una, meaning "a street"; the village was located at a junction in Masuria between the Teutonic Knights and the Grand Duchy of Lithuania during the Middle Ages. There was a filial church of the Catholic parish in Stare Juchy in the village.

In 1525 it became part of the Duchy of Prussia, remaining a part and fief of Poland, after the secularization of the Teutonic Knights. It was the seat of starosts (local administrators) from 1525 to 1616, when they relocated to Olecko. In 1529, the local church became a Protestant parish church, in which Polish services were held. As of 1600, the population of the village was solely Polish. The village was included within the Kingdom of Prussia in 1701 and the German Empire in 1871. Jerzy Wasiański, the author of the most popular 18th-century Polish hymnal in Masuria, was the pastor in Straduny until 1737. From 1818 to 1945, it was administered within Landkreis Lyck in the province of East Prussia. For centuries inhabited by Poles, in the 19th century, the village was subjected to Germanisation policies.

In a plebiscite after World War I to determine if the village would remain in Germany or become part of the newly restored Second Polish Republic, the majority of voters chose to remain in German East Prussia.

The village was largely untouched by fighting during World War II. The last Lutheran service at the local church was held on 29 October 1944. Because the church's rectory was used by Wehrmacht staff, it was destroyed shortly before the arrival of the Soviet Red Army on 18 January 1945. The Wehrmacht destroyed three nearby bridges over the Ełk River in order to impede the Red Army; two of the bridges were rebuilt by German prisoners of war after hostilities ended.

In 1945 the village became again part of Poland according to the Potsdam Agreement under its historic Polish name Straduny. The church was reconsecrated as a Roman Catholic church on 3 May 1946.
