= Bajtkowo =

- Village
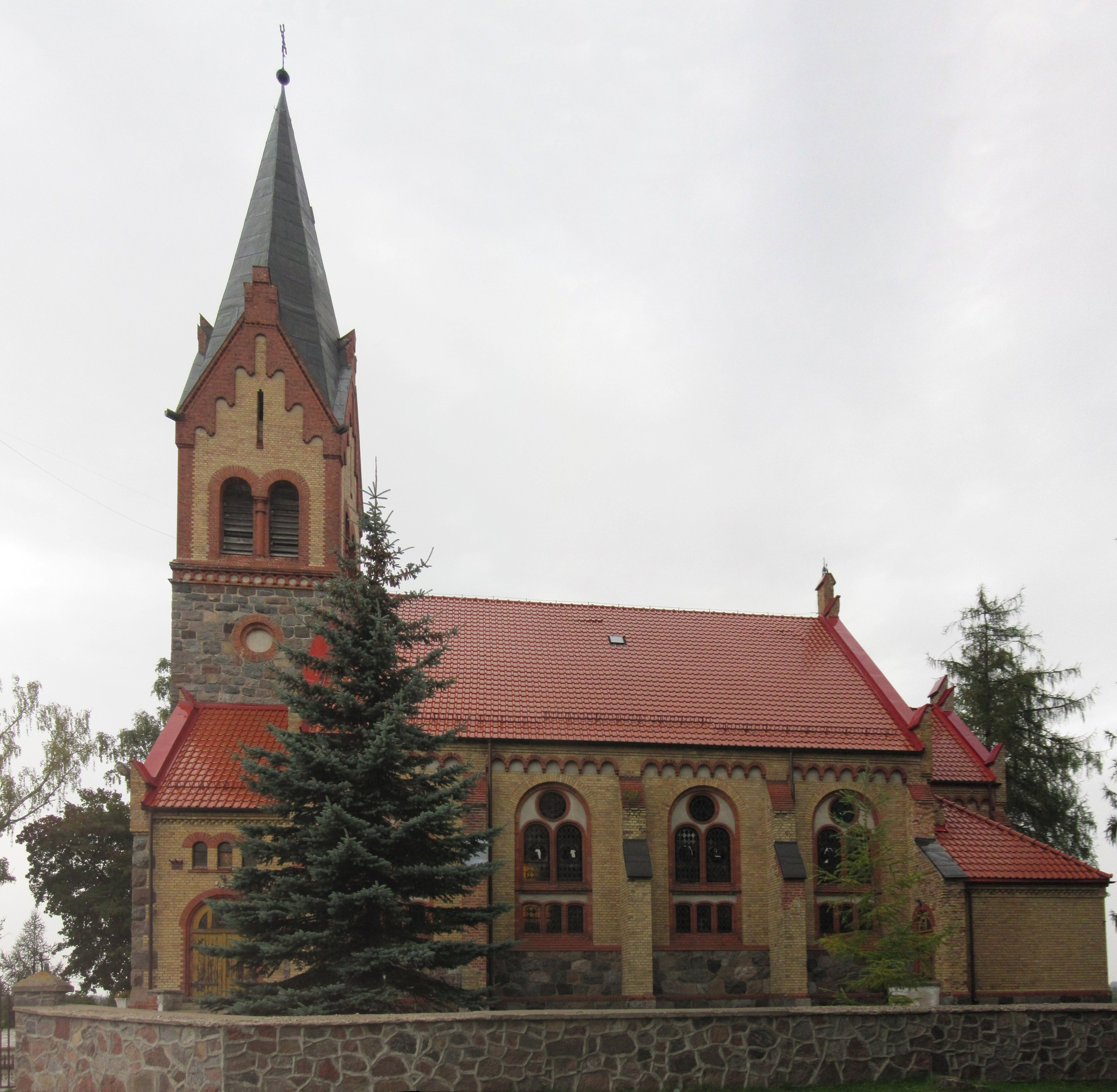
- Church of Our Lady of the Rosary

- Location within Poland
- Coordinates: 53°45′N 22°16′E
- Country: Poland
- Voivodeship: Warmian-Masurian
- County: Ełk
- Gmina: Ełk

Population (approx.)
  - Total: 60

Bajtkowo [bai̯tˈkɔvɔ] is a village in the administrative district of Gmina Ełk, within Ełk County, Warmian-Masurian Voivodeship, in northern Poland.
