= Sajzy =

- Village
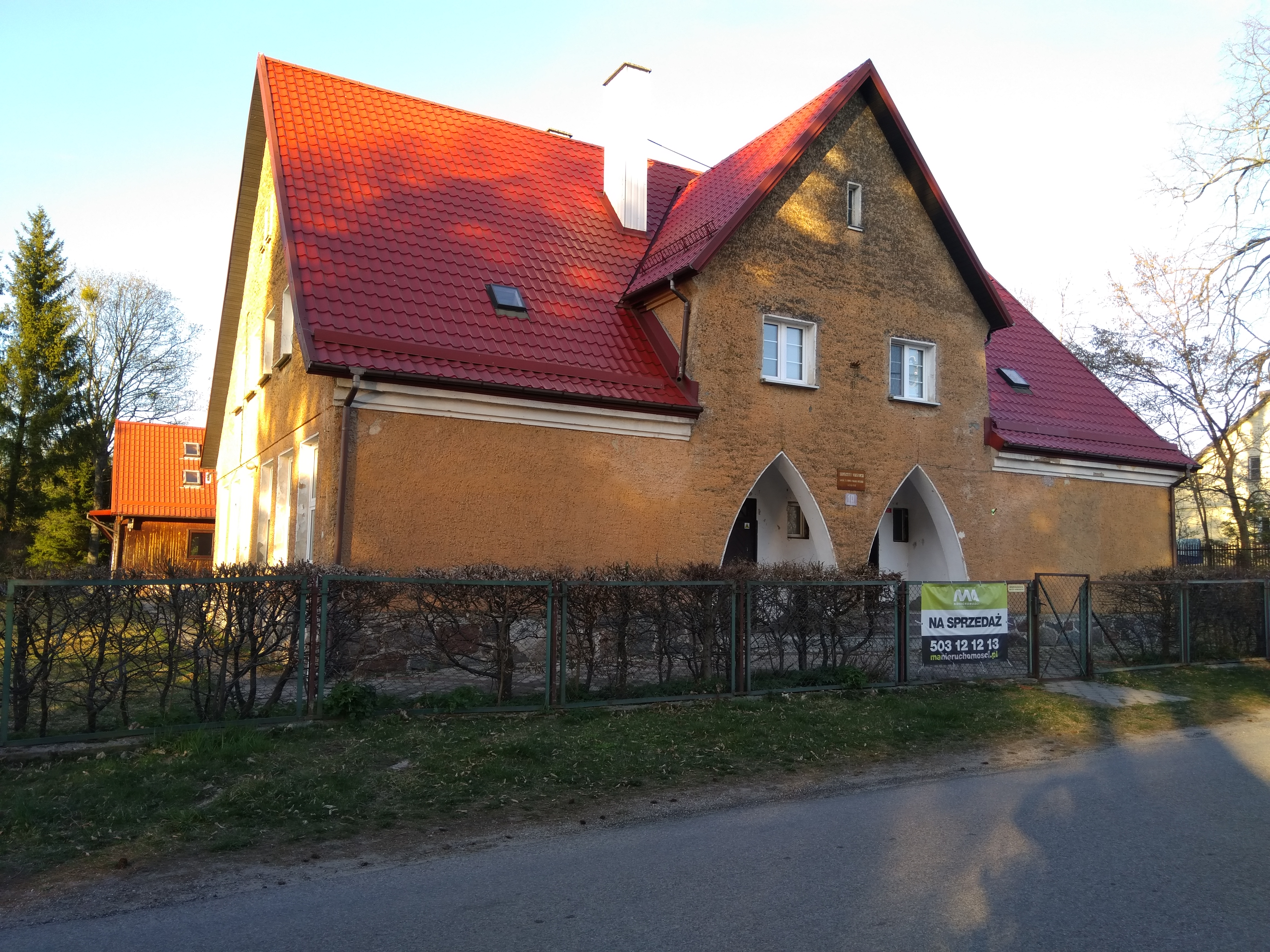

- Location within Poland
- Coordinates: 53°57′N 22°18′E
- Country: Poland
- Voivodeship: Warmian-Masurian
- County: Ełk
- Gmina: Ełk

Sajzy [ˈsai̯zɨ] is a village in the administrative district of Gmina Ełk, within Ełk County, Warmian-Masurian Voivodeship, in northern Poland.
