= Chojniak =

- Village
- Chojniak (2026)

- Location within Poland
- Coordinates: 53°54′42″N 22°20′38″E
- Country: Poland
- Voivodeship: Warmian-Masurian
- County: Ełk
- Gmina: Ełk
- Population: 310

Chojniak [ˈxɔi̯ɲak] is a village in the administrative district of Gmina Ełk, within Ełk County, Warmian-Masurian Voivodeship, in northern Poland.
