= Nowa Wieś Ełcka =

- Village
- Location within Poland
- Coordinates: 53°47′N 22°20′E
- Country: Poland
- Voivodeship: Warmian-Masurian
- County: Ełk
- Gmina: Ełk
- Population: 1,500

Nowa Wieś Ełcka [ˈnɔva ˈvjɛɕ ˈɛu̯t͡ska] is a village in the administrative district of Gmina Ełk, within Ełk County, Warmian-Masurian Voivodeship, in northern Poland.
