= Szeligi, Warmian-Masurian Voivodeship =

Szeligi
- Village
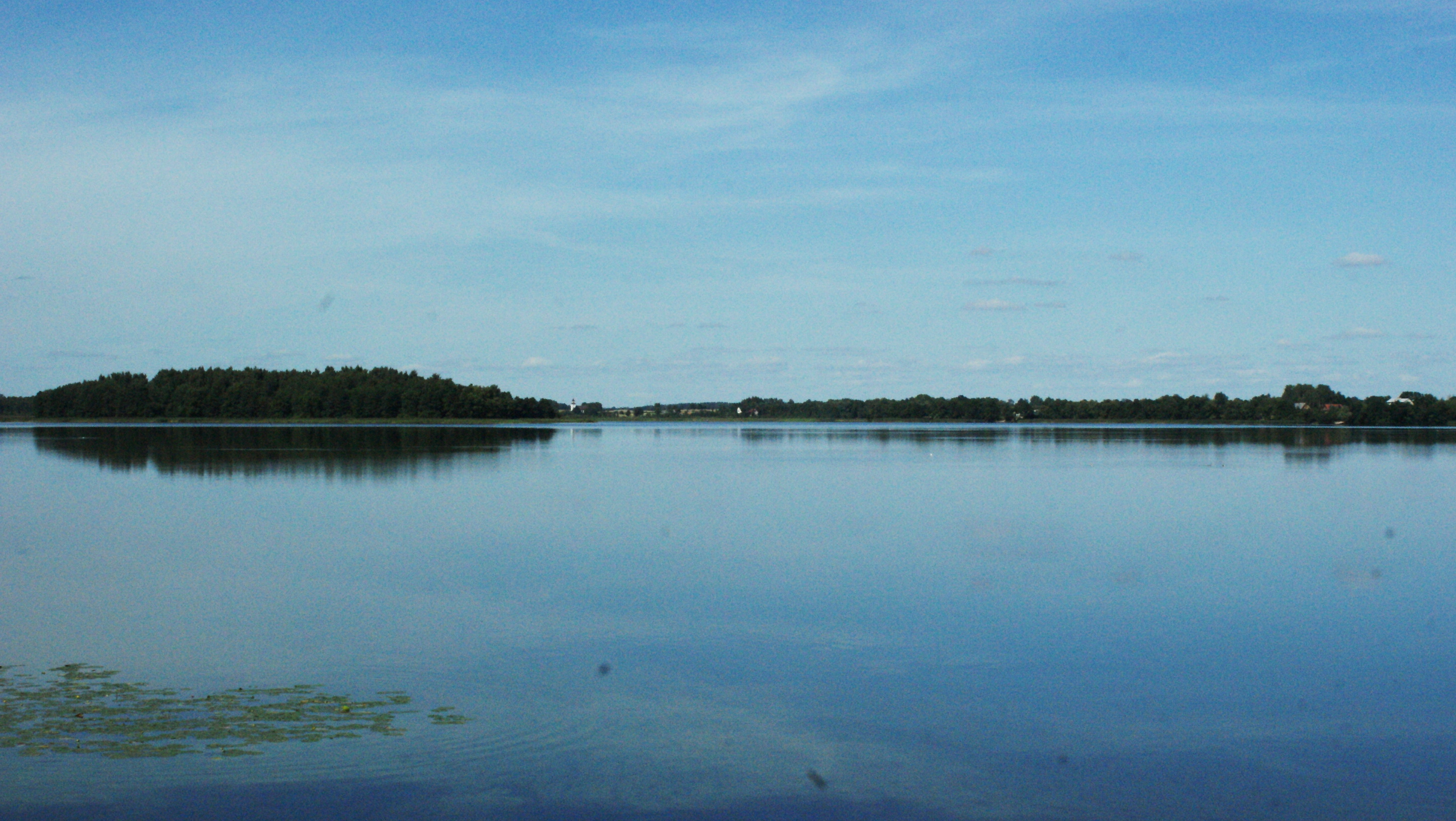
- Selmęt Wielki lake

- Location within Poland
- Coordinates: 53°49′18″N 22°25′7″E
- Country: Poland
- Voivodeship: Warmian-Masurian
- County: Ełk
- Gmina: Ełk
- Population: 20

Szeligi [ʂɛˈliɡi] is a village in the administrative district of Gmina Ełk, within Ełk County, Warmian-Masurian Voivodeship, in northern Poland.
