= Borki, Gmina Ełk =

Borki
- Village
- Location within Poland
- Coordinates: 53°42′38″N 22°18′40″E
- Country: Poland
- Voivodeship: Warmian-Masurian
- County: Ełk
- Gmina: Ełk

Borki [ˈbɔrki] is a village in the administrative district of Gmina Ełk, within Ełk County, Warmian-Masurian Voivodeship, in northern Poland.
