= Pistki =

- Village
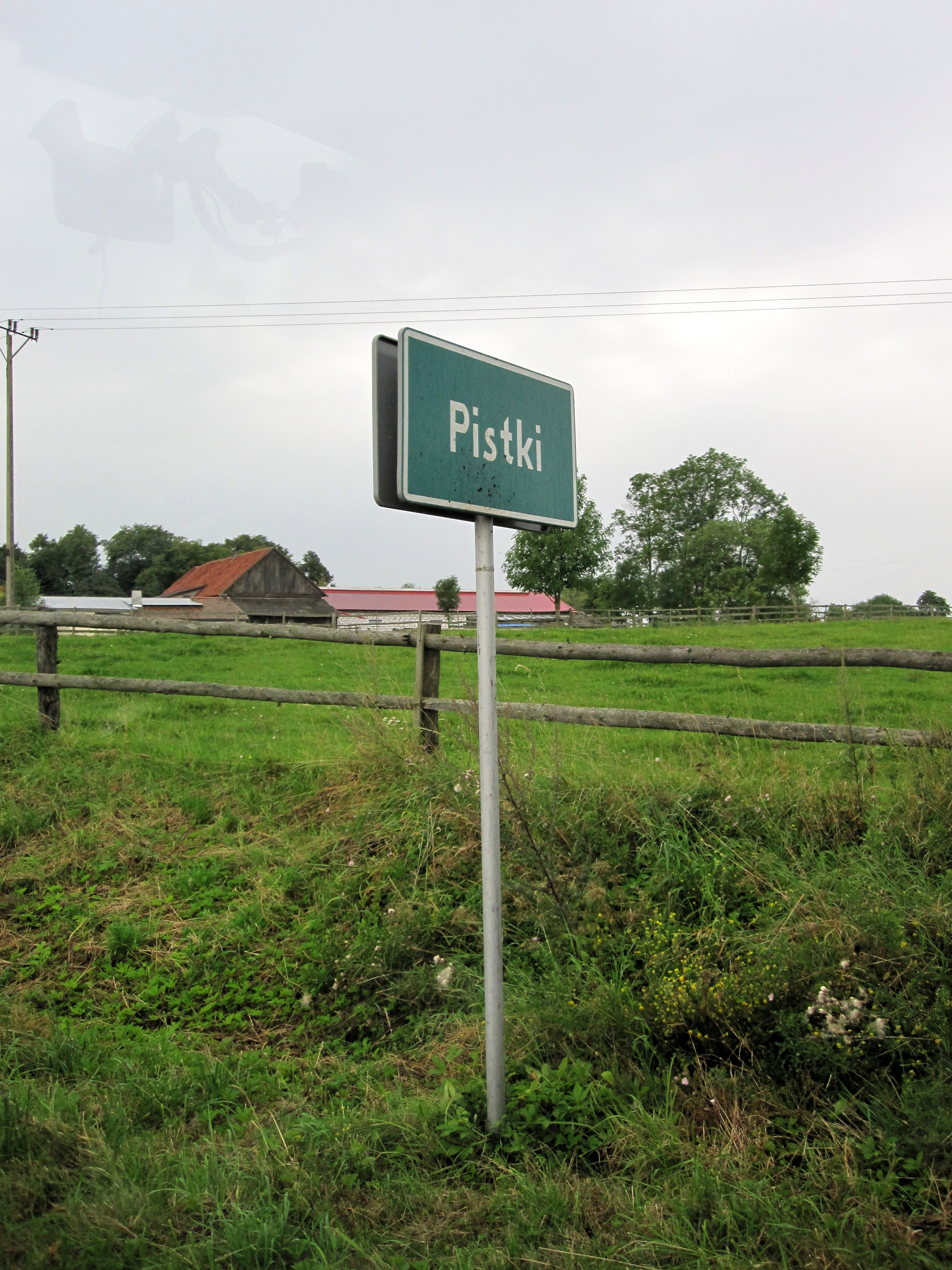
- Road sign in Pistki

- Location within Poland
- Coordinates: 53°46′48″N 22°12′51″E
- Country: Poland
- Voivodeship: Warmian-Masurian
- County: Ełk
- Gmina: Ełk

Pistki [ˈpistki] is a village in the administrative district of Gmina Ełk, within Ełk County, Warmian-Masurian Voivodeship, in northern Poland.
