= Buczki, Warmian-Masurian Voivodeship =

Buczki
- Village
- Location within Poland
- Coordinates: 53°50′N 22°27′E
- Country: Poland
- Voivodeship: Warmian-Masurian
- County: Ełk
- Gmina: Ełk

Buczki [ˈbut͡ʂki] is a village in the administrative district of Gmina Ełk, within Ełk County, Warmian-Masurian Voivodeship, in northern Poland.
