= Puza =

Puza is a surname. Notable people with the surname include:

- Adam Puza (born 1951), Polish politician
- Martin Puza (born 1970), Austrian footballer
