= Tracze, Warmian-Masurian Voivodeship =

Tracze
- Village
- Location within Poland
- Coordinates: 53°48′00″N 22°21′00″E
- Country: Poland
- Voivodeship: Warmian-Masurian
- County: Ełk
- Gmina: Ełk

Tracze [ˈtrat͡ʂɛ] is a village in the administrative district of Gmina Ełk, within Ełk County, Warmian-Masurian Voivodeship, in northern Poland.
