= Bobry =

Bobry may refer to the following places:

- Bobry, Łódź Voivodeship (central Poland)
- Bobry, Masovian Voivodeship (east-central Poland)
- Bobry, Gmina Ełk in Warmian-Masurian Voivodeship (north Poland)
- Bobry, Gmina Prostki in Warmian-Masurian Voivodeship (north Poland)
