= Giże, Ełk County =

Giże
- Village
- Location within Poland
- Coordinates: 53°47′28″N 22°30′46″E
- Country: Poland
- Voivodeship: Warmian-Masurian
- County: Ełk
- Gmina: Ełk

Giże [ˈɡiʐɛ] is a village in the administrative district of Gmina Ełk, within Ełk County, Warmian-Masurian Voivodeship, in northern Poland.
