= Guzki, Ełk County =

Guzki
- Village
- Location within Poland
- Coordinates: 53°49′31″N 22°12′51″E
- Country: Poland
- Voivodeship: Warmian-Masurian
- County: Ełk
- Gmina: Ełk

Guzki [ˈɡuski] is a village in the administrative district of Gmina Ełk, within Ełk County, Warmian-Masurian Voivodeship, in northern Poland.

== Notable residents ==
- Kurt Christofzik (1910–1976), Wehrmacht officer
