= Rydzewo, Ełk County =

Rydzewo
- Village
- Location within Poland
- Coordinates: 53°55′53″N 22°21′15″E
- Country: Poland
- Voivodeship: Warmian-Masurian
- County: Ełk
- Gmina: Ełk

Rydzewo [rɨˈd͡zɛvɔ] is a village in the administrative district of Gmina Ełk, within Ełk County, Warmian-Masurian Voivodeship, in northern Poland.
