= Pisanica =

Pisanica may refer to:

- Pisanica (Croatian), the easter egg ritual in Croatia
- Pisanica, Gmina Ełk, settlement in northern Poland
- Pisanica, Gmina Kalinowo, settlement in northern Poland
- Velika Pisanica, munincipality in Croatia
