= Ciernie, Gmina Ełk =

Ciernie
- Village
- Location within Poland
- Coordinates: 53°44′41″N 22°17′18″E
- Country: Poland
- Voivodeship: Warmian-Masurian
- County: Ełk
- Gmina: Ełk

Ciernie [ˈt͡ɕɛrɲɛ] is a village in the administrative district of Gmina Ełk, within Ełk County, Warmian-Masurian Voivodeship, in northern Poland.
