= Krokocie =

- Village
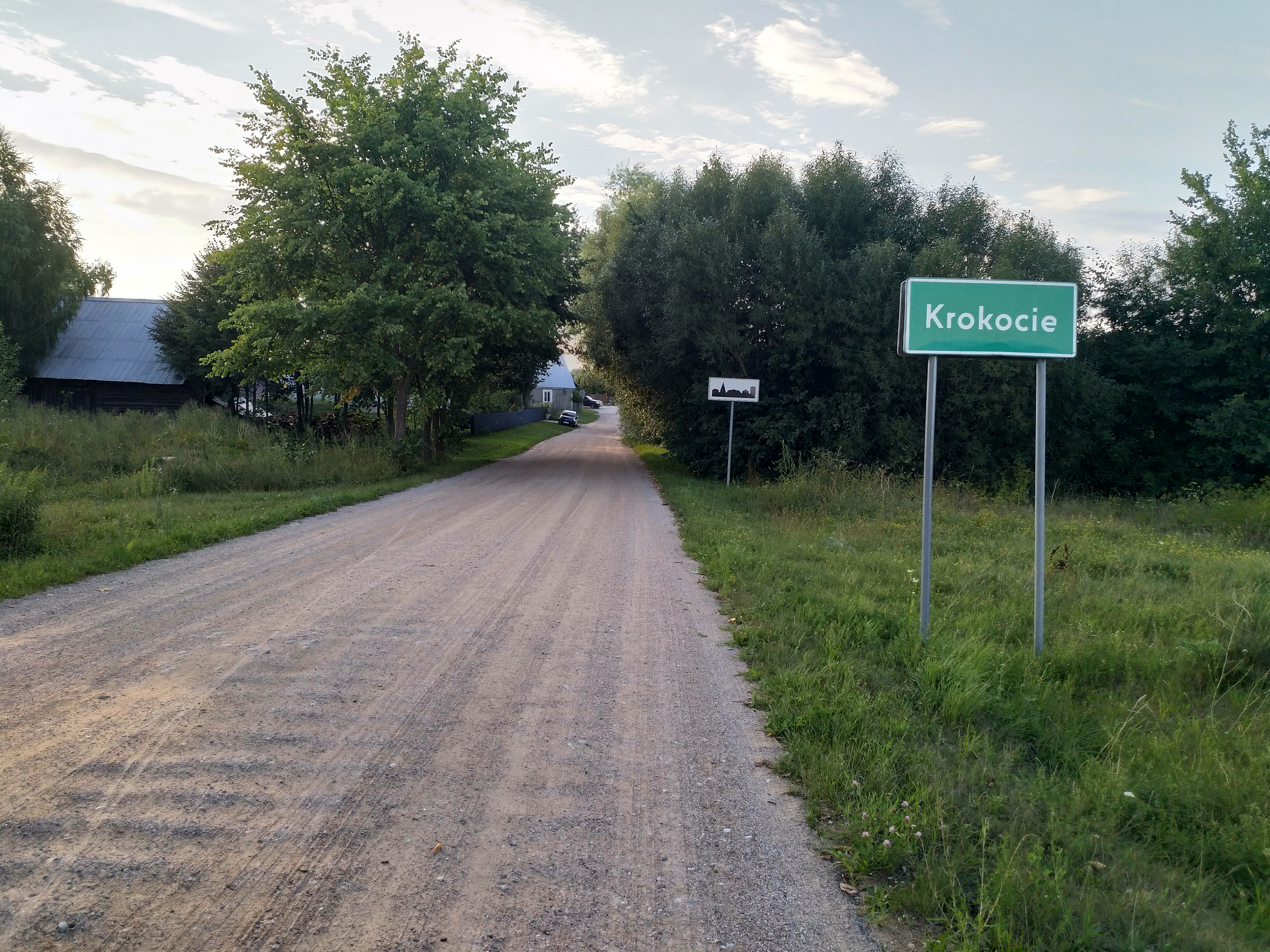
- Krokocie (2024)

- Location within Poland
- Coordinates: 53°53′03″N 22°24′35″E
- Country: Poland
- Voivodeship: Warmian-Masurian
- County: Ełk
- Gmina: Ełk

Krokocie [krɔˈkɔt͡ɕɛ] is a village in the administrative district of Gmina Ełk, within Ełk County, Warmian-Masurian Voivodeship, in northern Poland.
