= Ruska Wieś, Ełk County =

Ruska Wieś
- Village
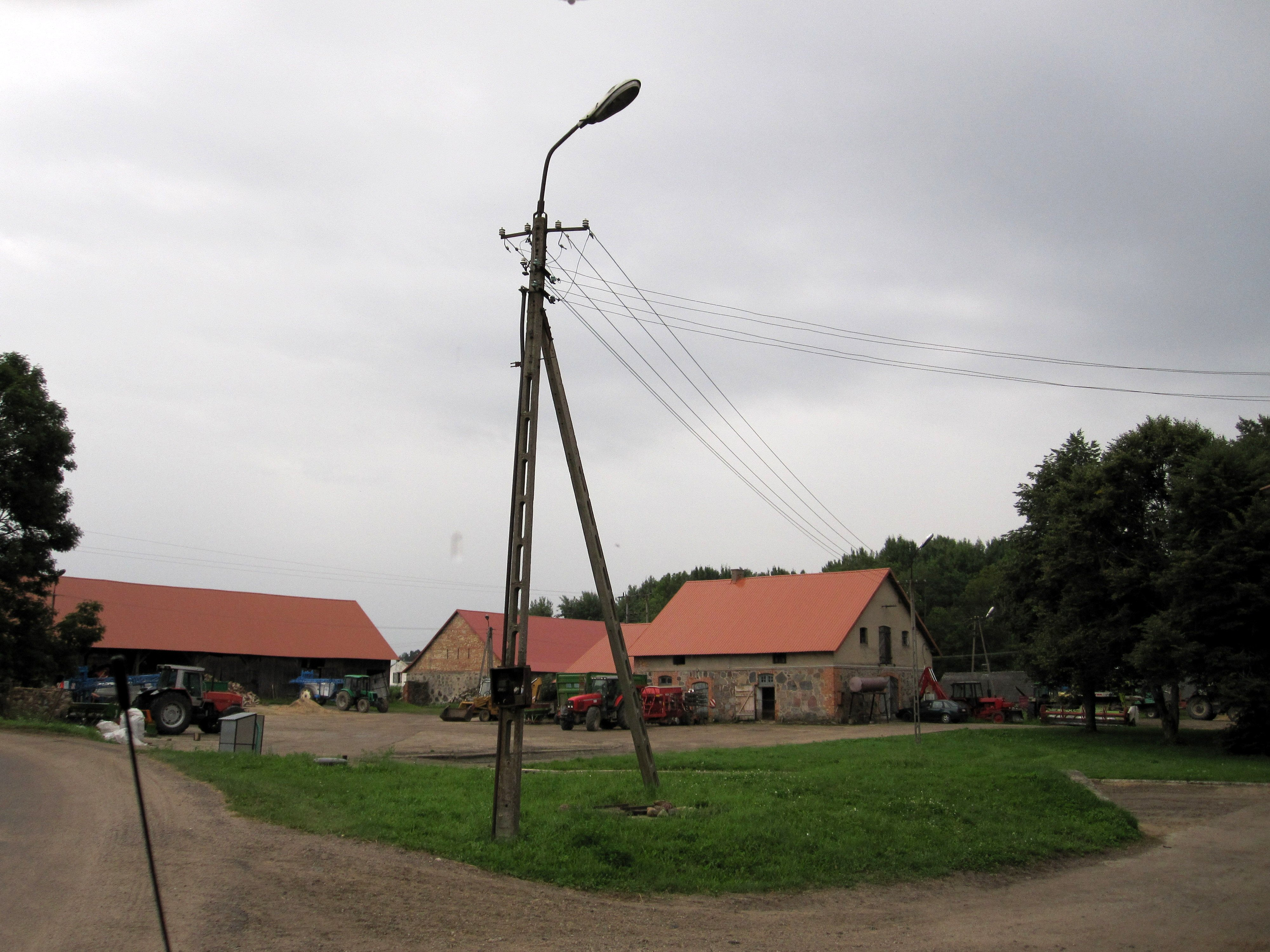

- Location within Poland
- Coordinates: 53°47′N 22°12′E
- Country: Poland
- Voivodeship: Warmian-Masurian
- County: Ełk
- Gmina: Ełk

Population
  - Total: 350
- Time zone: UTC+1 (CET)
  - Summer (DST): UTC+2 (CEST)
- Vehicle registration: NEL

Ruska Wieś [ˈruska ˈvjɛɕ] is a village in the administrative district of Gmina Ełk, within Ełk County, Warmian-Masurian Voivodeship, in north-eastern Poland. It is located in Masuria.
