= Pisanica, Gmina Ełk =

Pisanica
- Settlement
- Location within Poland
- Coordinates: 53°51′37″N 22°24′50″E
- Country: Poland
- Voivodeship: Warmian-Masurian
- County: Ełk
- Gmina: Ełk

Pisanica [pisaˈnit͡sa] is a settlement in the administrative district of Gmina Ełk, within Ełk County, Warmian-Masurian Voivodeship, in northern Poland.
