= Koziki, Warmian-Masurian Voivodeship =

Koziki
- Village
- Location within Poland
- Coordinates: 53°48′31″N 22°29′56″E
- Country: Poland
- Voivodeship: Warmian-Masurian
- County: Ełk
- Gmina: Ełk
- Founded: 1485
- Time zone: UTC+1 (CET)
  - Summer (DST): UTC+2 (CEST)
- Postal code: 19-301
- Vehicle registration: NEL

Koziki [kɔˈʑiki] is a village in the administrative district of Gmina Ełk, within Ełk County, Warmian-Masurian Voivodeship, in northern Poland. It is situated on the southern shore of Selmęt Wielki Lake in the region of Masuria.

== History ==
Koziki dates back to 1485, when Maciej Sordach was granted 15 włókas of land to establish the village. Since its establishment, it was inhabited by Polish people.
