= Judziki, Ełk County =

Judziki
- Village
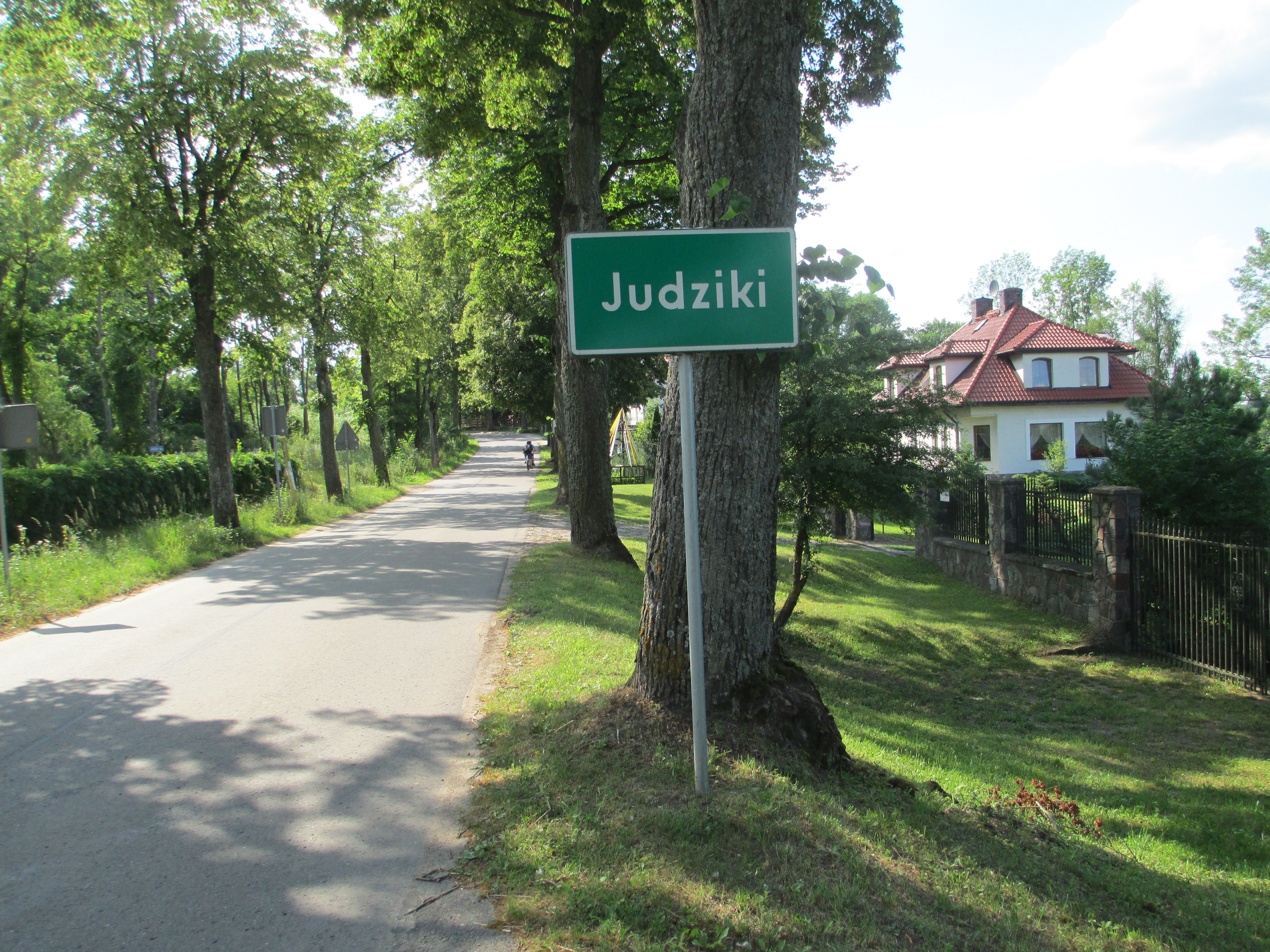
- Street of Judziki, Ełk County

- Location within Poland
- Coordinates: 53°49′43″N 22°15′06″E
- Country: Poland
- Voivodeship: Warmian-Masurian
- County: Ełk
- Gmina: Ełk

Judziki ([juˈd͡ʑiki]) is a village in the administrative district of Gmina Ełk, within Ełk County, Warmian-Masurian Voivodeship, in northern Poland.
