= Chełchy, Ełk County =

Chełchy
- Village
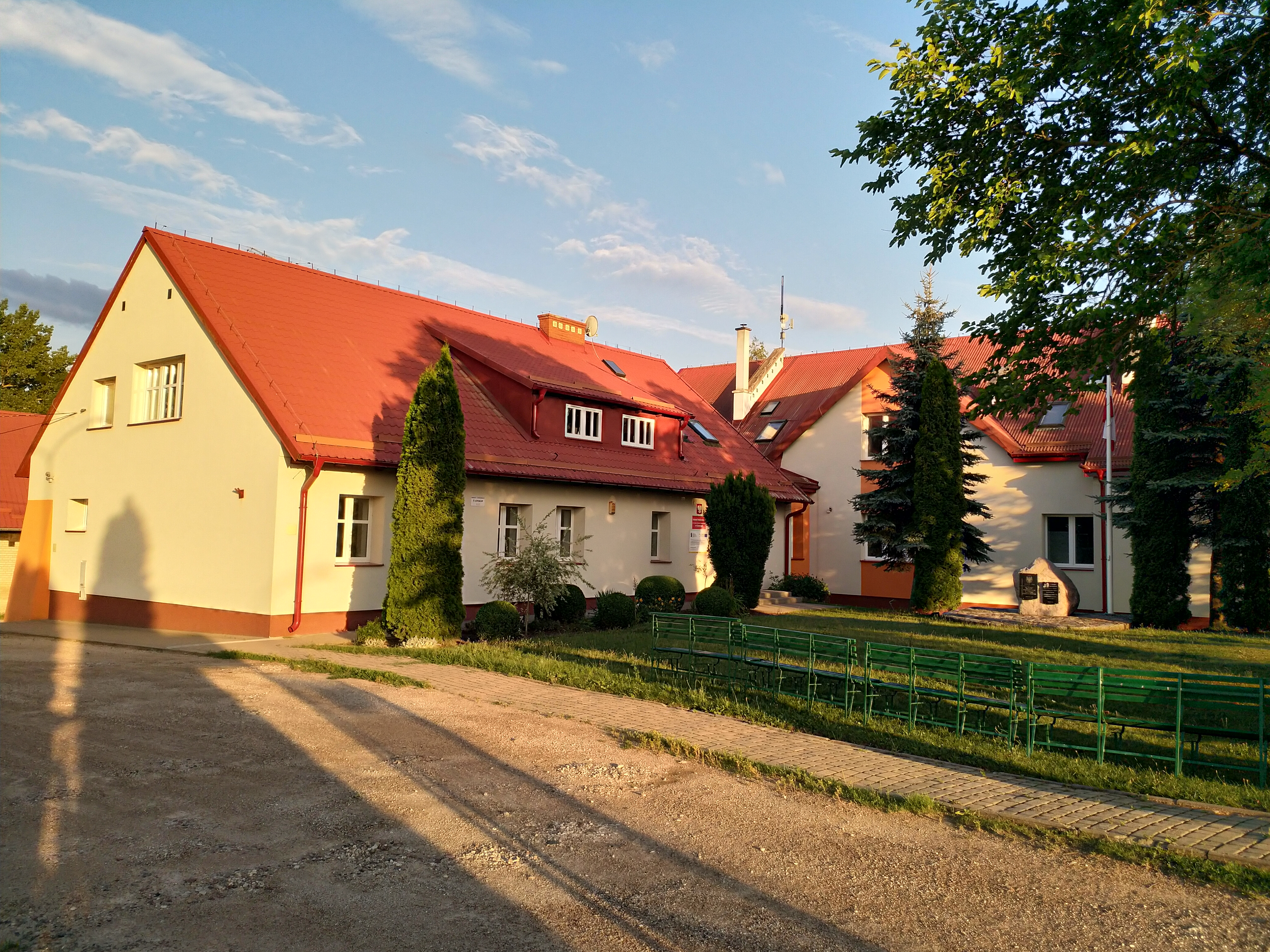

- Location within Poland
- Coordinates: 53°53′5.06″N 22°27′34.62″E
- Country: Poland
- Voivodeship: Warmian-Masurian
- County: Ełk
- Gmina: Ełk

Chełchy [ˈxɛu̯xɨ] is a village in the administrative district of Gmina Ełk, within Ełk County, Warmian-Masurian Voivodeship, in northern Poland.
