= Przytuły, Ełk County =

Przytuły
- Village
- Location within Poland
- Coordinates: 53°55′44″N 22°23′11″E
- Country: Poland
- Voivodeship: Warmian-Masurian
- County: Ełk
- Gmina: Ełk

Przytuły [pʂɨˈtuwɨ] is a village in the administrative district of Gmina Ełk, within Ełk County, Warmian-Masurian Voivodeship, in northern Poland. It is located in Masuria.
