= Bobry, Gmina Ełk =

Bobry
- Village
- Location within Poland
- Coordinates: 53°44′8″N 22°20′55″E
- Country: Poland
- Voivodeship: Warmian-Masurian
- County: Ełk
- Gmina: Ełk

Bobry [ˈbɔbrɨ] is a village in the administrative district of Gmina Ełk, within Ełk County, Warmian-Masurian Voivodeship, in northern Poland.
