= Adam Puza =

Polish politician

member of Sejm 2005-2007
- In office 25 September 2005 – 2006

Personal details
- Born: 1951 (age 74–75)
- Party: Law and Justice

Adam Jan Puza (born 2 January 1951 in Szarejki) is a Polish politician. He was elected to Sejm on 25 September 2005, getting 5,213 votes in 35 Olsztyn district as a candidate from the Law and Justice list.

== See also ==
- Members of Polish Sejm 2005-2007
