= Gmina Ełk =

Gmina Ełk Ełk Commune
- Gmina
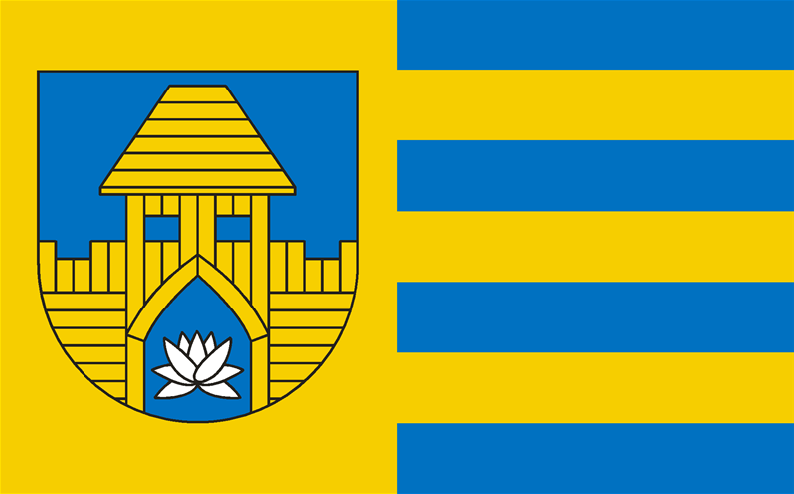
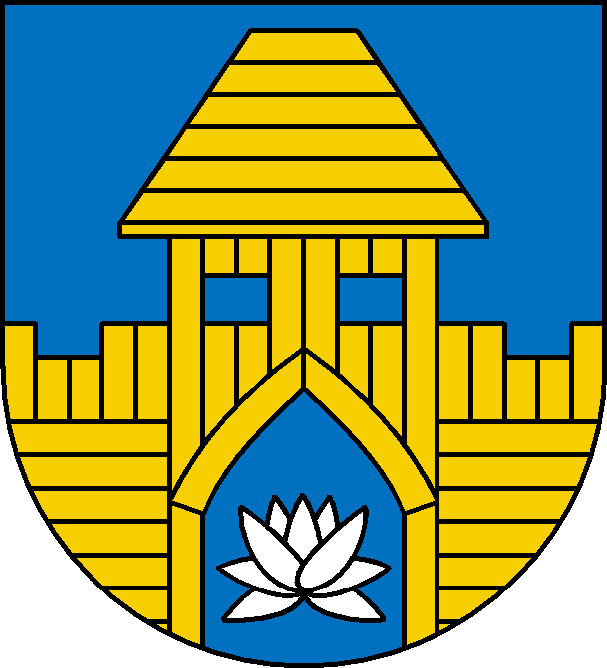
- Flag Coat of arms
- Interactive map of Gmina Ełk
- Coordinates (Ełk): 53°49′17″N 22°21′44″E
- Country: Poland
- Voivodeship: Warmian-Masurian
- County: Ełk
- Seat: Ełk

Area
  - Total: 378.61 km^{2} (146.18 sq mi)

Population (2011)
  - Total: 10,980
  - Density: 29.00/km^{2} (75.11/sq mi)
- Website: http://www.elk.gmina.pl/

Gmina Ełk is a rural gmina (administrative district) in Ełk County, Warmian-Masurian Voivodeship, in northern Poland. Its seat is the town of Ełk, although the town is not part of the territory of the gmina.

The gmina covers an area of 378.61 square kilometres (146.2 sq mi), and as of 2006 its total population is 10,148 (10,980 in 2011).

== Villages ==
Gmina Ełk contains the villages and settlements of Bajtkowo, Barany, Bartosze, Białojany, Bienie, Bobry, Borecki Dwór, Borki, Brodowo, Buczki, Buniaki, Chełchy, Chojniak, Chruściele, Chrzanowo, Ciernie, Czaple, Ełk POHZ, Giże, Guzki, Janisze, Judziki, Kałęczyny, Karbowskie, Konieczki, Koziki, Krokocie, Lega, Lepaki Małe, Lepaki Wielkie, Mącze, Mąki, Maleczewo, Malinówka Mała, Malinówka Wielka, Małkinie, Miluki, Mołdzie, Mostołty, Mrozy Małe, Mrozy Wielkie, Niekrasy, Nowa Wieś Ełcka, Oracze, Piaski, Pisanica, Pistki, Płociczno, Przykopka, Przytuły, Regiel, Regielnica, Rękusy, Rostki Bajtkowskie, Rożyńsk, Ruska Wieś, Rydzewo, Rymki, Sajzy, Sędki, Siedliska, Skup, Śniepie, Sordachy, Straduny, Suczki, Szarejki, Szarek, Szeligi, Talusy, Tracze, Wityny, Woszczele, Zdedy and Zdunki.

== Neighbouring gminas ==
Gmina Ełk is bordered by the gminas of Biała Piska, Kalinowo, Olecko, Orzysz, Prostki, Stare Juchy and Świętajno.
