= Koziki, Vladimir Oblast =

Koziki Козики
- Village
- Location within Vladimir Oblast Location within Russia
- Coordinates: 56°15′N 40°06′E
- Country: Russia
- Region: Vladimir Oblast
- District: Suzdalsky District
- Time zone: UTC+3:00

Koziki (Russian: Козики) is a rural locality (a village) in Novoalexandrovskoye Rural Settlement, Suzdalsky District, Vladimir Oblast, Russia. The population was 38 as of 2010. There are 9 streets.

== Geography ==
Koziki is located 33 km southwest of Suzdal (the district's administrative centre) by road. Petrakovo is the nearest rural locality.
