= Ełk County =

Ełk County Powiat ełcki
- County
- Flag Coat of arms

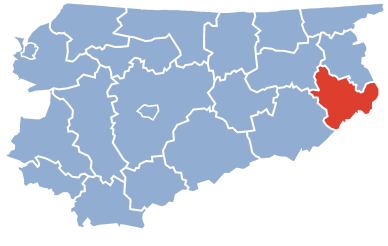
- Location within the voivodeship

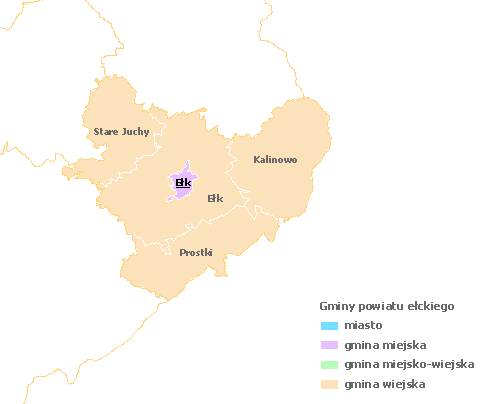
- Division into gminas
- Coordinates (Ełk): 53°49′17″N 22°21′44″E
- Country: Poland
- Voivodeship: Warmian–Masurian
- Seat: Ełk
- Gminas: Total 5 (incl. 1 urban): Ełk; Gmina Ełk; Gmina Kalinowo; Gmina Prostki; Gmina Stare Juchy

Area
  - Total: 1,111.87 km^{2} (429.30 sq mi)

Population (2019)
  - Total: 91,446
  - Density: 82.245/km^{2} (213.01/sq mi)
  - Urban: 62,006
  - Rural: 29,440
- Car plates: NEL
- Website: www.powiat.elk.pl

Ełk County (Polish: powiat ełcki) is a unit of territorial administration and local government (powiat) in the Warmian–Masurian Voivodeship, northern Poland. It came into being on 1 January 1999 as a result of the Polish local government reforms passed in 1998. Its administrative seat and only town is Ełk, which lies 123 kilometres (76 mi) east of the regional capital Olsztyn.

The county covers an area of 1,111.87 square kilometres (429.3 sq mi). As of 2019, Ełk County's total population was 91,446, with the town of Ełk having a population of 62,006.

== Neighbouring counties ==
Ełk County is bordered by Olecko County to the north, Suwałki County to the north-east, Augustów County to the east, Grajewo County to the south, and Pisz County and Giżycko County to the west.

== Administrative divisions ==
The county is subdivided into five gminas (one urban and four rural). These are listed in the following table, in descending order of population.

| Gmina | Type | Area | Population (2019) | Seat |
|---|---|---|---|---|
| Ełk | urban | 21.1 km^{2} (8.1 sq mi) | 62,006 | |
| Gmina Ełk | rural | 378.6 km^{2} (146.2 sq mi) | 11,684 | Ełk * |
| Gmina Prostki | rural | 230.5 km^{2} (89.0 sq mi) | 7,263 | Prostki |
| Gmina Kalinowo | rural | 285.2 km^{2} (110.1 sq mi) | 6,751 | Kalinowo |
| Gmina Stare Juchy | rural | 196.6 km^{2} (75.9 sq mi) | 3,742 | Stare Juchy |
* seat not part of the gmina
