= Ełk Lake =

Lake in Poland

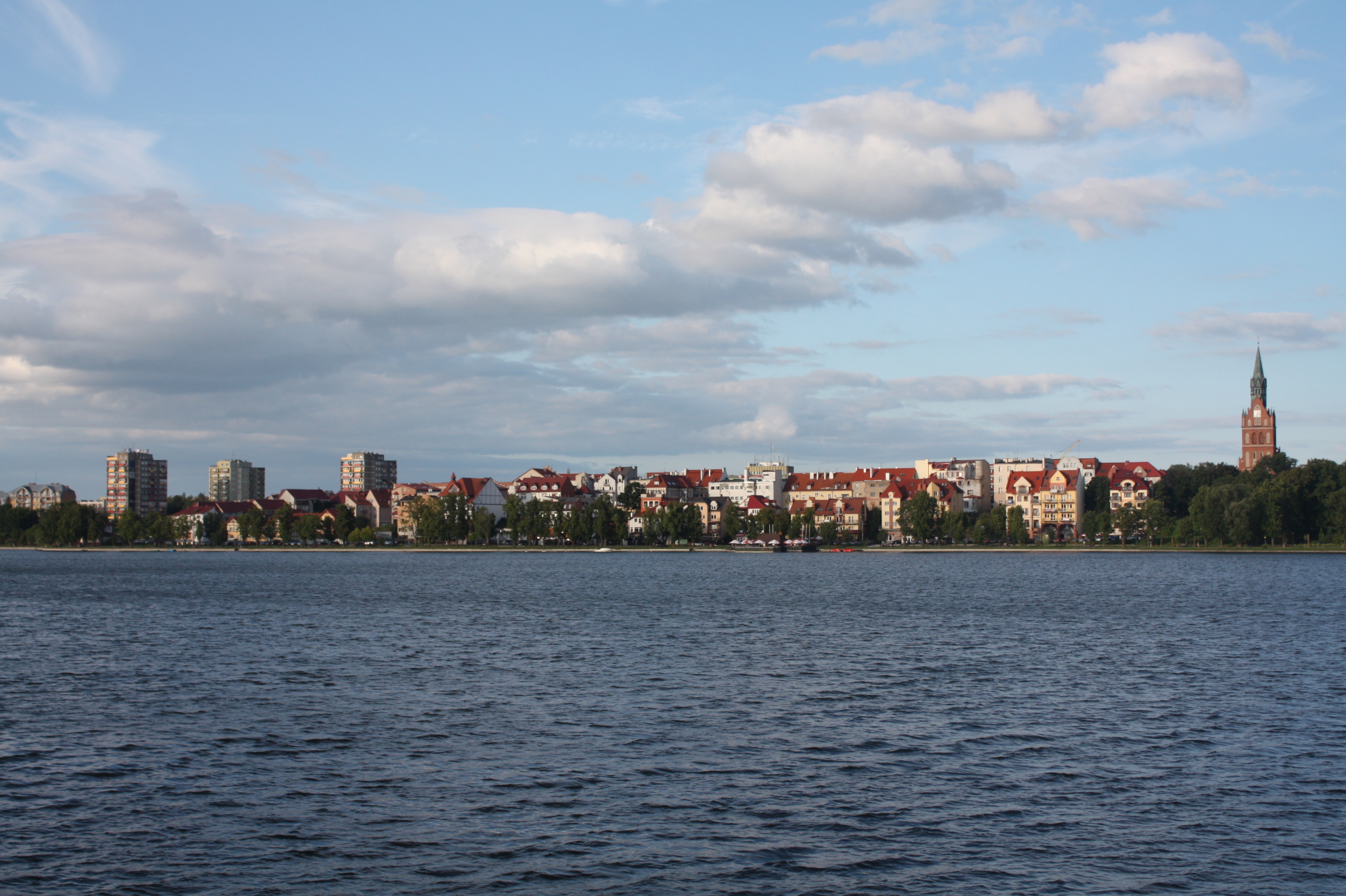
- Ełk Lake with the town of Ełk in the background

- Location within Poland
- Location: Masurian Lake District
- Coordinates: 53°48′24″N 22°20′58″E
- Primary inflows: River Ełk, Woszczelski Stream
- Catchment area: 979.8 ha (2,421 acres)
- Basin countries: Poland
- Max. length: 6.5 km (4.0 mi)
- Surface area: 385 ha (950 acres) (maximum)
- Average depth: 15 m (49 ft)
- Max. depth: 55.8 m (183 ft)
- Water volume: 5.74203×10^{6} m^{3} (2.02778×10^{8} cu ft)
- Shore length^{1}: 18.65 km (11.59 mi)
- Surface elevation: 120.3 m (395 ft) (Note: Historic references for elevation give 199.9 m (656 ft) but lake does apparently vary in height)
- Settlements: Ełk
- ^{1} Shore length is not a well-defined measure.

Ełk Lake (Ełckie, Polish: Jezioro Ełckie, German: Lycker See; Lithuanian: Luko ežeras) is a fresh water lake in the Masurian Lake District of Poland's Warmia-Mazury Province to the west of the town of Ełk. It has had recent pollution challenges. A larger lake in the lake district to the east of the town of Ełk is Selmęt Wielki.

The lake was created by glacial action during the Pleistocene ice age and has a maximum surface area of 385 ha (950 acres). Its mean depth is 15 m (49 ft) with 55.8 m (183 ft) as a maximum. It is divided into two distinct parts, the northern ("small", Polish: Małe Ełckie) and southern ("large", Polish: Duże Ełckie), by a narrows spanned by a bridge. Primarily fed by the Ełk River, a right-bank tributary of the Biebrza River from the south west, the lake discharges into Lake Sunowo to its north-west, and the smaller Lake Szarek associated with the village of the same name to its west.

== Pollution ==
From the point of view of its recent eutrophication, there are three zones of the lake, northern, central (southern), and western. The two beaches in the central zone popular with the tourists visiting Ełk on the lakes east coast are suspected to now be among the primary sources of microplastics lake pollution. However the eastern side of the lake is polluted by sewage and city drainage and the western side by agricultural drainage.

== Gallery ==
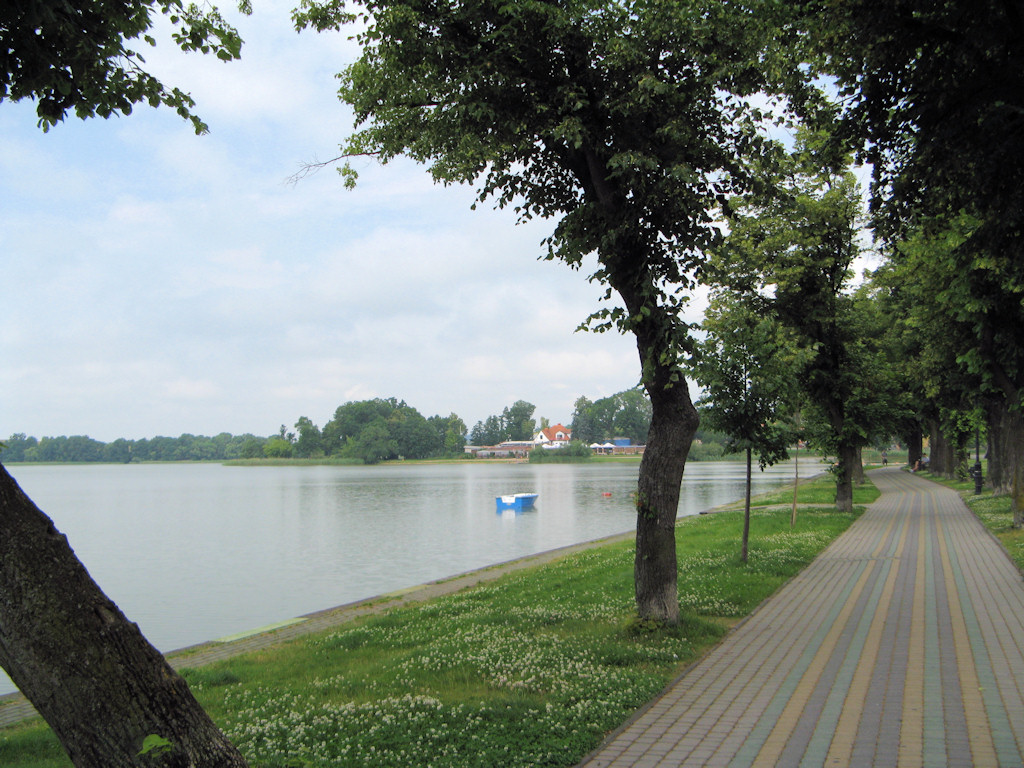
Promenade

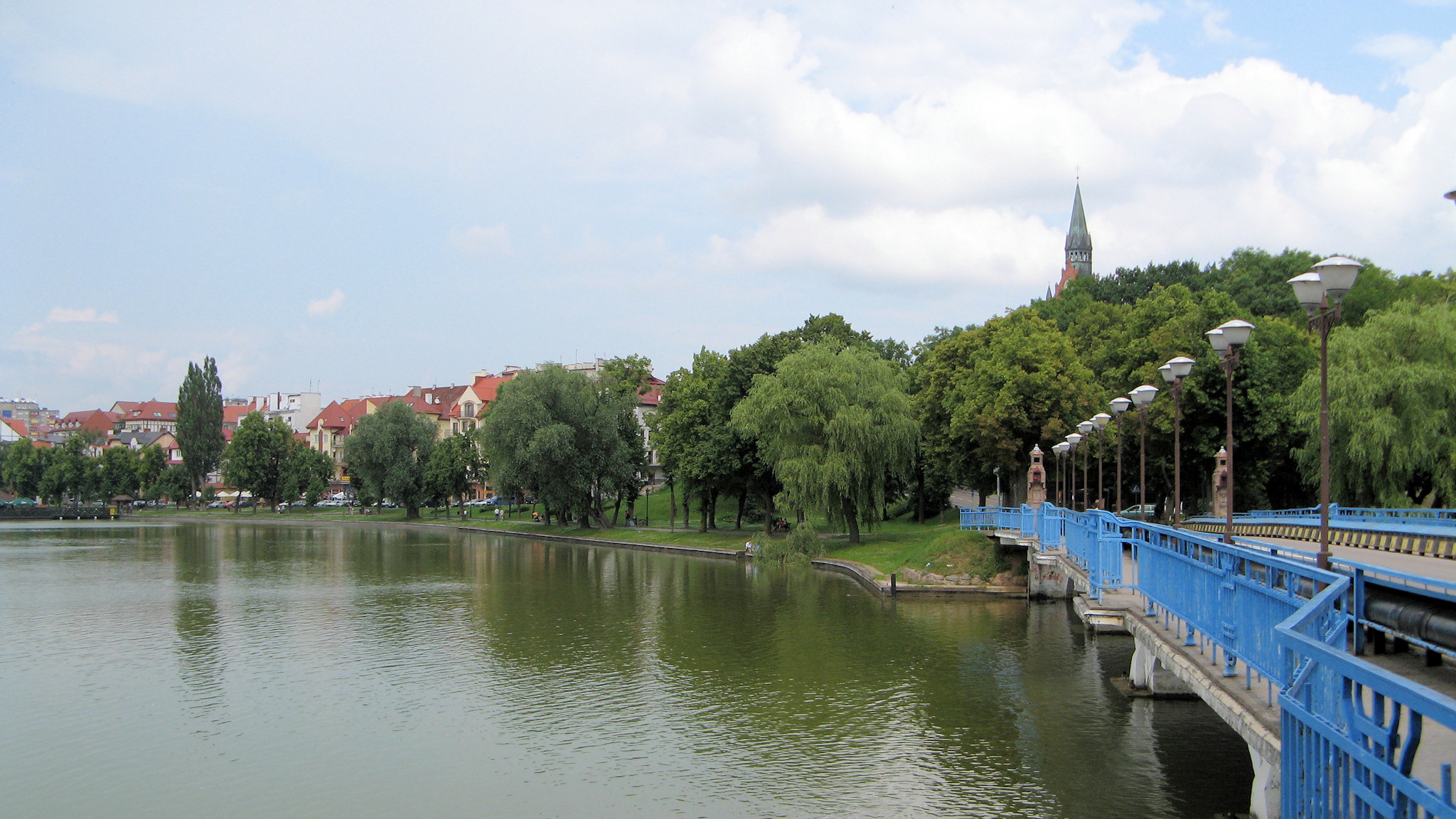
Panorama of the bridge on the lake

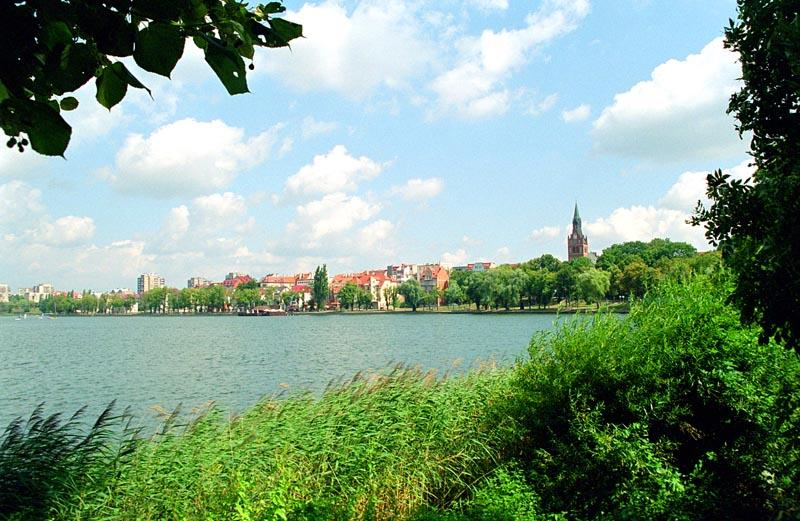
View of the lake and the city from the west

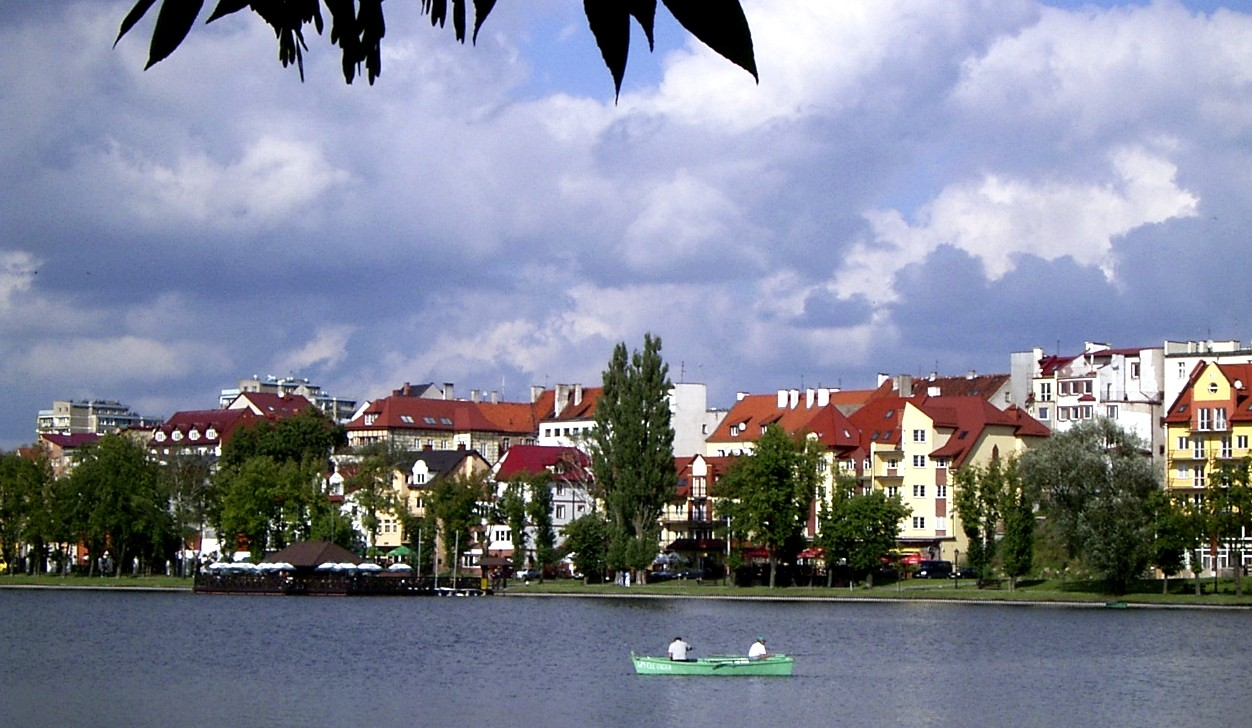
View the east bank

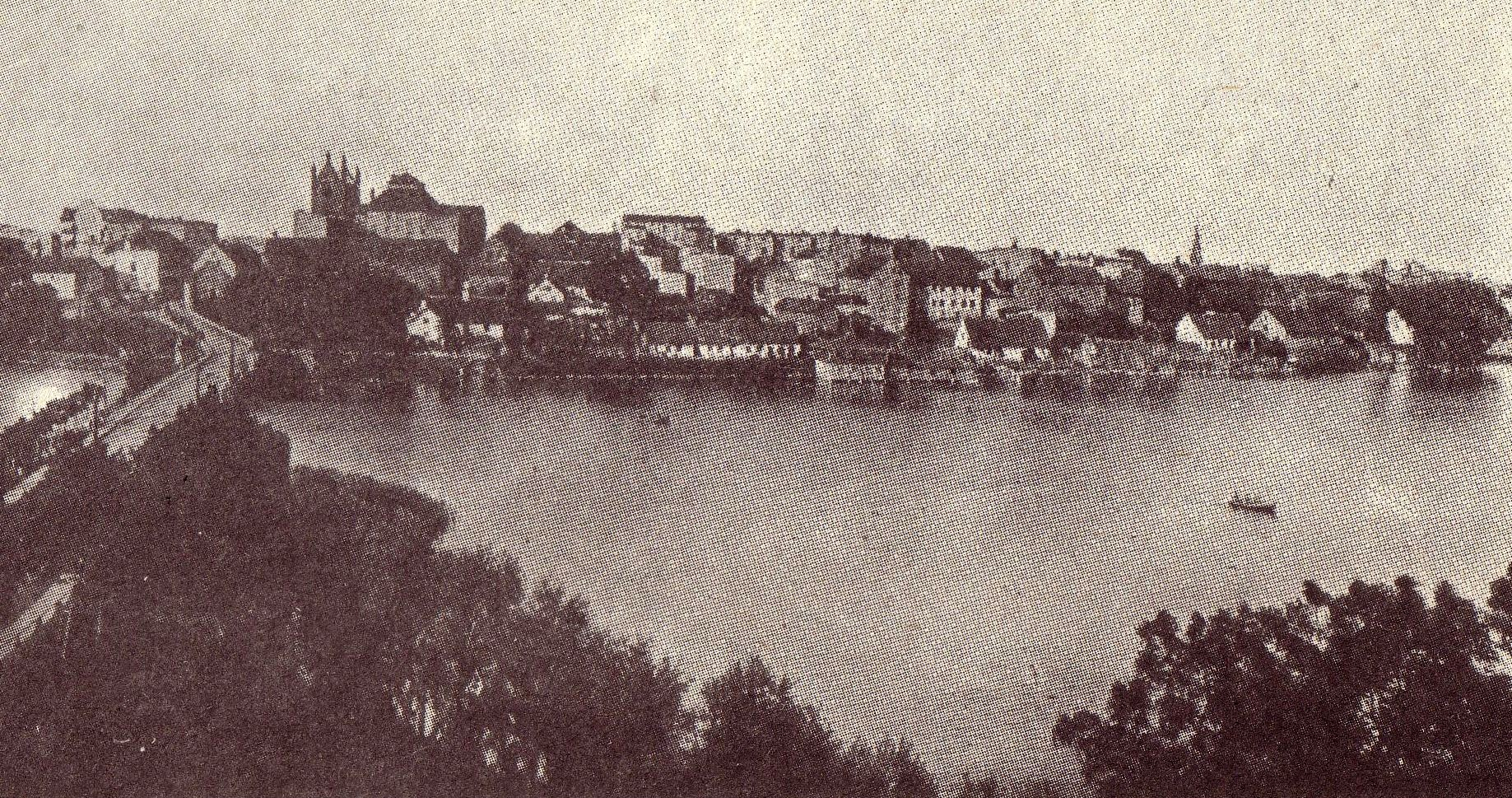
Lake circa 1900
