= Ełk =

City in Warmian-Masurian Voivodeship, Poland

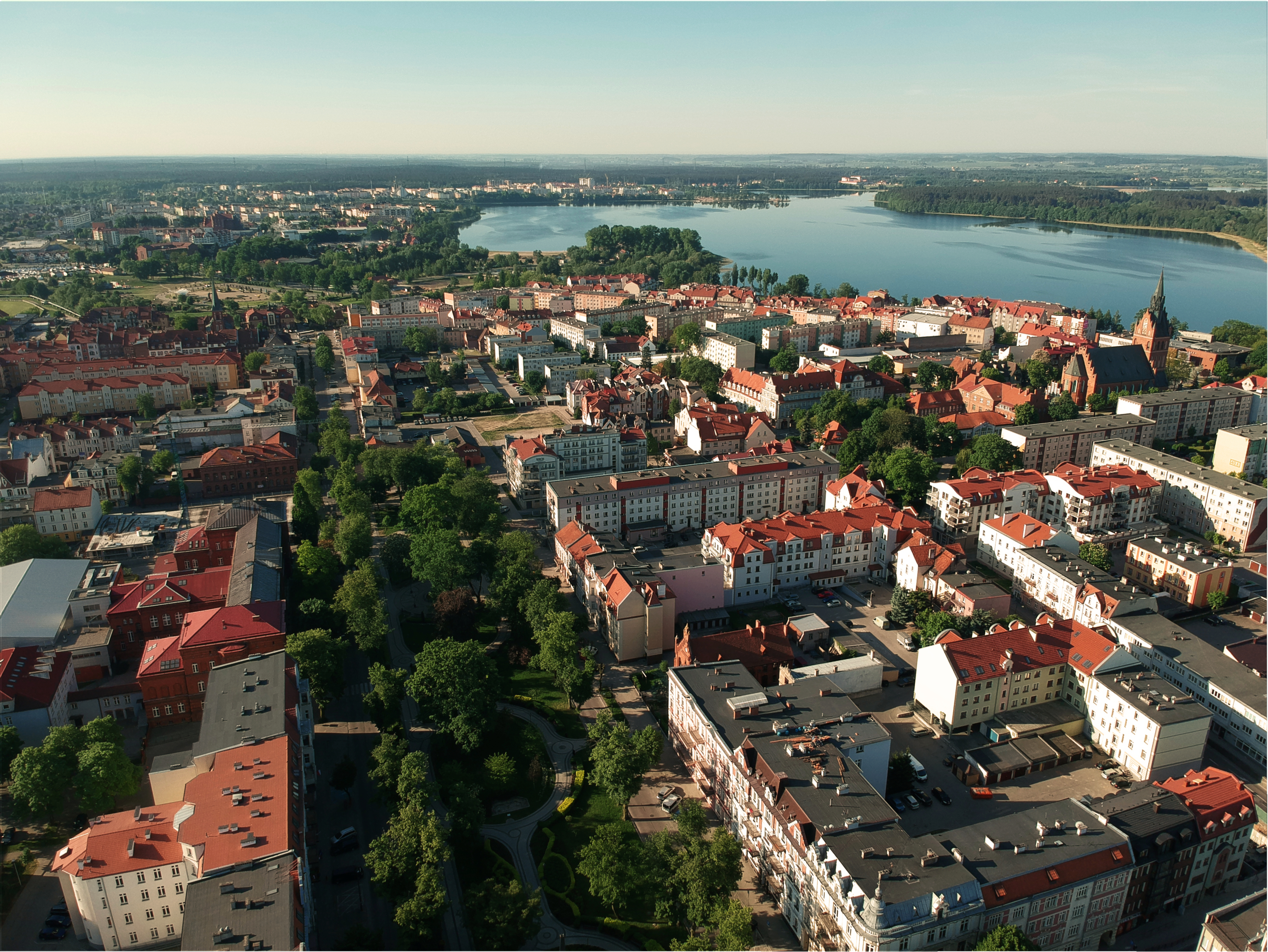
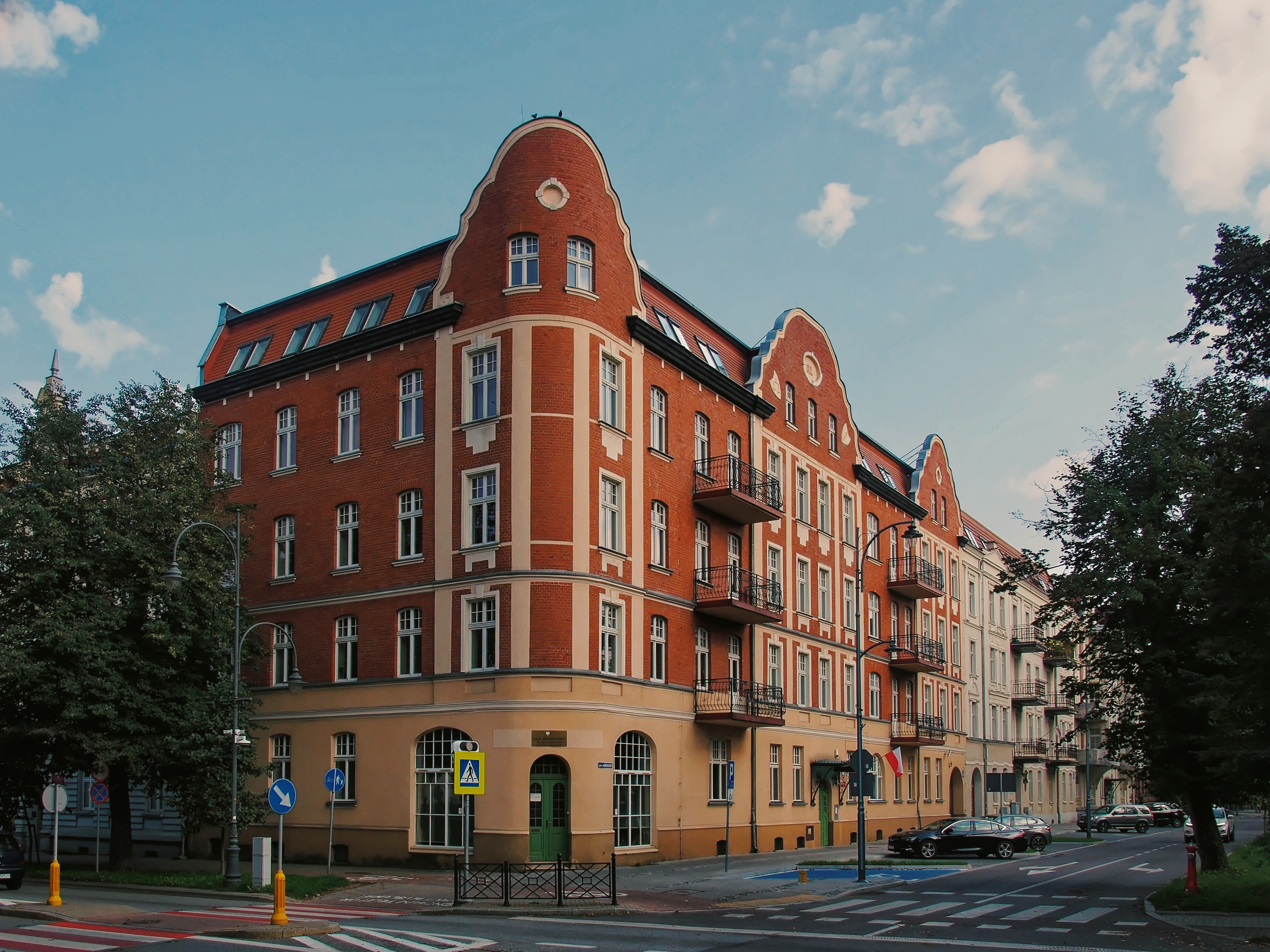
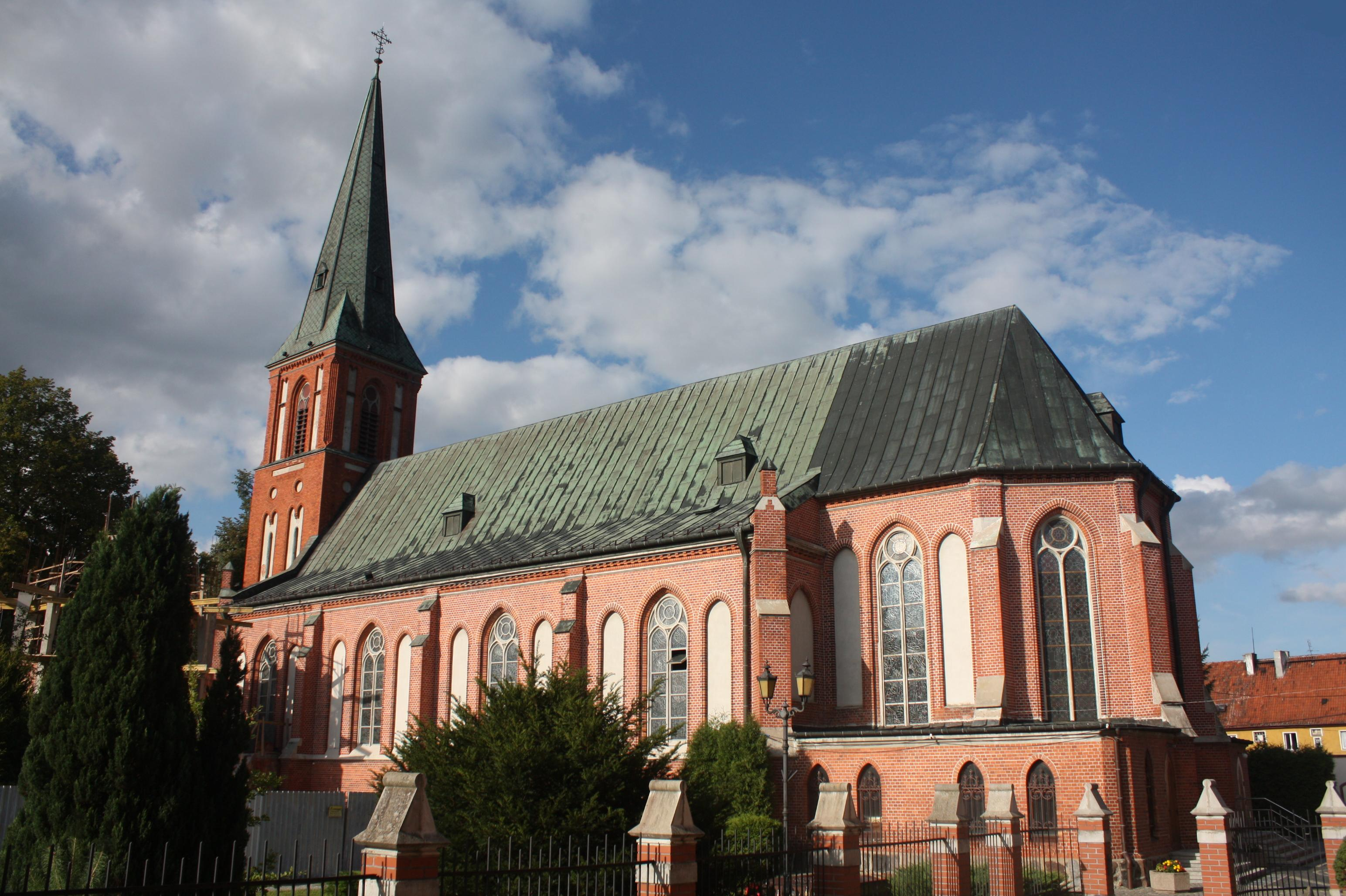
- City center with the Solidarity Park District Court Ełk Cathedral

- Flag Coat of arms

- Location within Poland
- Coordinates: 53°49′17″N 22°21′44″E
- Country: Poland
- Voivodeship: Warmian-Masurian
- County: Ełk
- Gmina: Ełk (urban gmina)
- Established: 1237
- Town rights: 1445

Government
  - City mayor: Tomasz Andrukiewicz

Area
  - Total: 22.07 km^{2} (8.52 sq mi)

Population (31 December 2021)
  - Total: 61,677
  - Density: 2,930/km^{2} (7,600/sq mi)
- Time zone: UTC+1 (CET)
  - Summer (DST): UTC+2 (CEST)
- Postal code: 19-300
- Area code: +48 87
- Car plates: NEL
- Website: http://www.elk.pl

Ełk (Polish pronunciation: [ɛwk]; German: Lyck) (Note: formerly Polish: Łek;; Old Prussian: Luks; Yotvingian: Lukas, sometimes spelled without the Polish diacritics as Elk) is a city in northeastern Poland with 61,677 inhabitants as of December 2021. It is the seat of Ełk County in the Warmian–Masurian Voivodeship. It lies on the shore of Ełk Lake, which was formed by a glacier, and is surrounded by extensive forests. It is the largest city of Masuria.

The town was founded by the Teutonic Order and settled by Poles in the late 14th century and received town rights in 1445. In the 16th century, it became a leading center for Polish printing and education in Masuria. Ełk is historically considered the capital of Masuria.

Today Ełk is an important rail and road junction and food industry hub in north-eastern Poland, and the seat of the Roman Catholic Diocese of Ełk. One of the principal attractions in the area is legal hunting.

== History ==
=== Middle Ages ===
The area where the town of Ełk is located was originally inhabited by Jatvingians, a Baltic peoples, during the Early Middle Ages. By 1281, Skomand the last leader of the pagan Jatvingians, capitulated to the crusading Teutonic Knights, who initially were invited in 1226 by Konrad I of Masovia from the Polish Piast dynasty to put an end to the constant pagan raids into his territory.

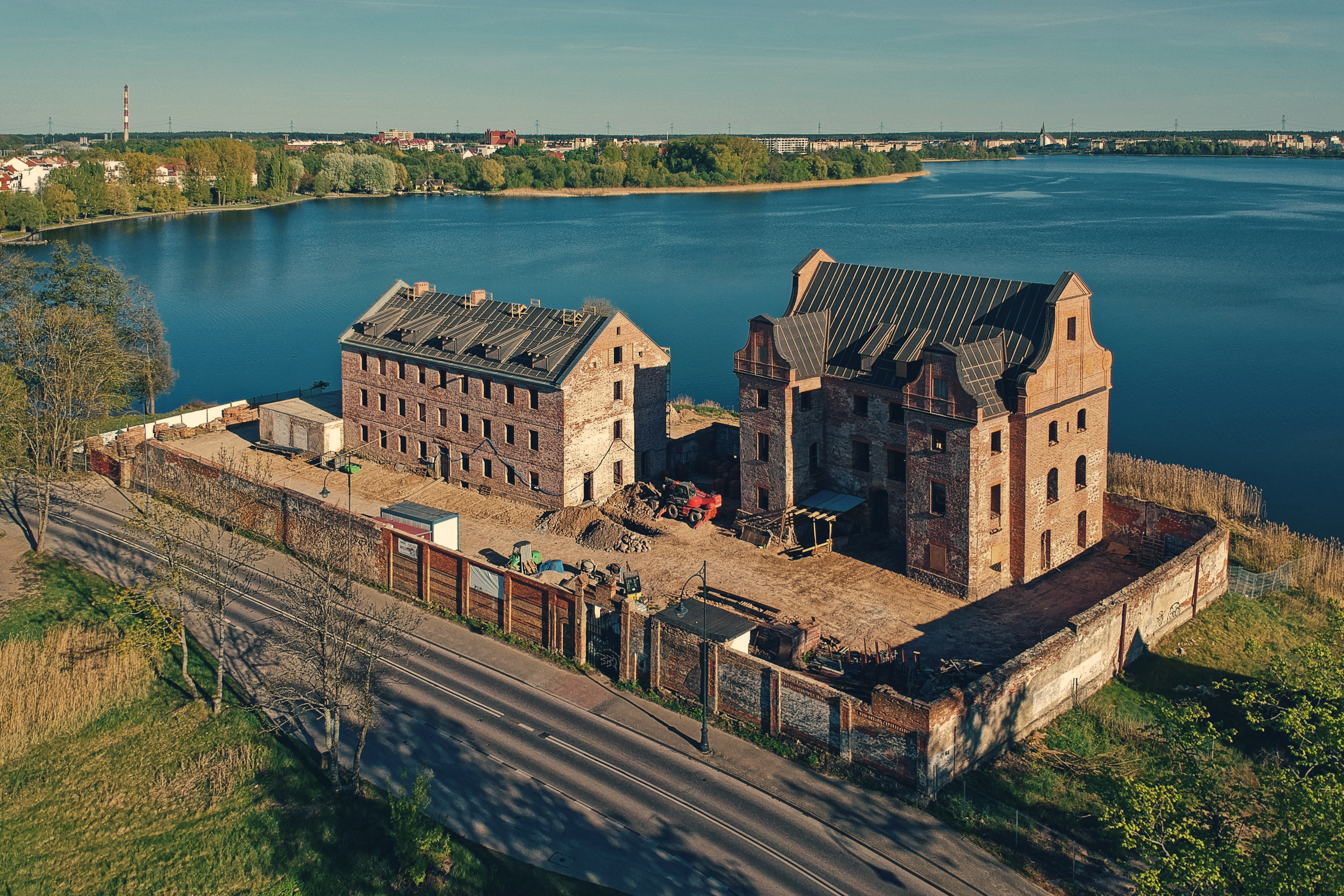
Ełk Castle during renovation works in 2025

After 1323, the northern part of the region was administered by the commandery of Brandenburg, while the larger part with the later town belonged to Balga commandery. A former Old Prussian settlement, the town was first documented in 1398 around a castle built by the Teutonic Knights. It was populated by Poles from Mazovia. The town's name has various postulated origins. Its German version, Lyck, is postulated to be derived from its Old Prussian name, Luks (from the word for waterlily, luka), while another theory holds that the name comes from Polish word łęg, meaning "meadow". Old Polish names of the town included Łek, Łęg and Łęk. In 1425 the village was granted Chełmno rights and Bartosz Bratomi, most possibly from Mazovia, became its first lokator. It received town rights in 1445.

After the outbreak of the Thirteen Years' War in 1454, the town sided with the Prussian Confederation, at whose request the Polish King Casimir IV Jagiellon announced the incorporation of the region into the Kingdom of Poland, which resulted in the town becoming part of the Polish state. The town was briefly captured by the Teutonic Knights in 1455, and later on, it was conquered alternately by the Poles and the Teutonic Knights. After 1466 it came under Polish suzerainty as a fief.

=== Early modern era ===
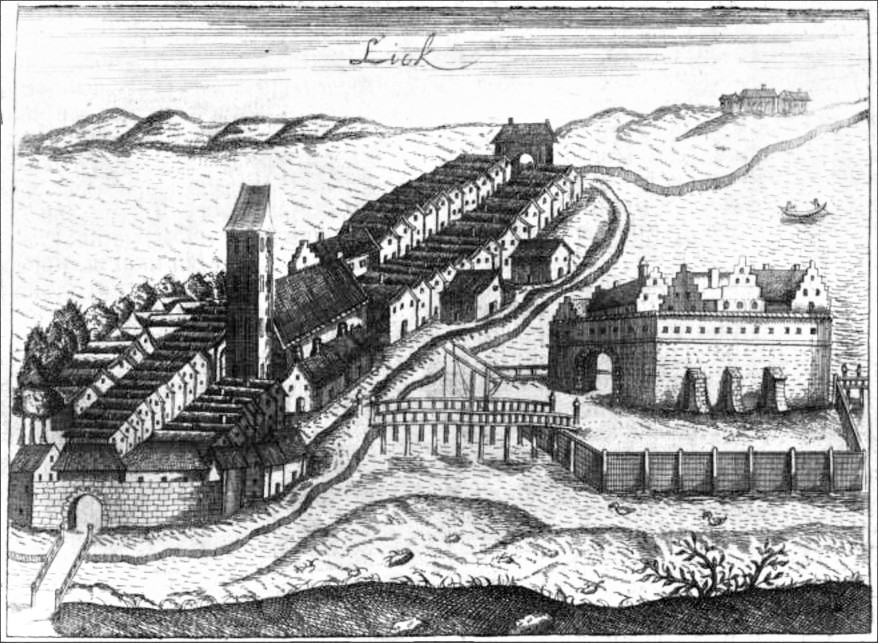
Old castle and the town of Ełk in the 17th century

In 1537, Duke Albert of Prussia donated an estate to Jan Malecki, a Polish printer from Kraków who had either fled or moved to Ducal Prussia for material reasons, to establish a printing house, the first in Masuria. After converting to Lutheranism, Malecki translated and published Martin Luther's Small Catechism in Polish In 1546 a Polish school, the first school for secondary education in Masuria, was founded in the city, where apart from locals also Polish nobles from the Polish–Lithuanian Commonwealth were taught. Polish pastor, translator, publisher and co-creator of the literary Polish language Hieronim Malecki was the school's first rector. In the mid-16th century Ełk was one of the most thriving centers of Polish-language printing.

In 1560, weekly markets were established, and later also three annual fairs. Initially, sermons at the local church were delivered only in Polish, and in 1584, German sermons were additionally introduced. In 1600, the town's population was Polish, and almost all innkeepers had Polish surnames. In 1639 the King of Poland Władysław IV Vasa visited the town. It remained under Polish suzerainty until 1657, when Poland renounced its sovereignty in the Treaty of Bromberg and the Hohenzollern dynasty of Brandenburg gained hereditary sovereignty in the Duchy.

=== 18th and 19th centuries ===
In 1709-10, the plague claimed 1,300 victims. In 1831, 300 people, about 10 percent of the populace, died of the cholera, in 1837 another 80 and 333 in 1852.

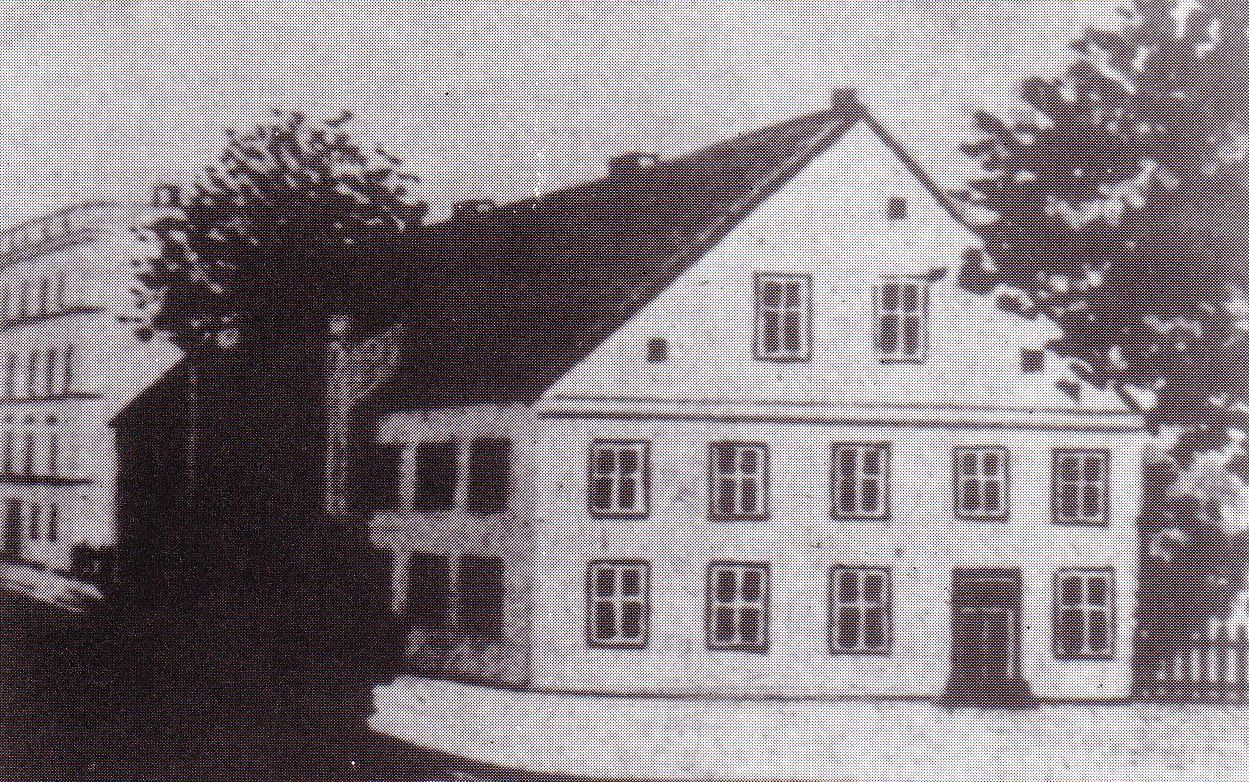
Old Gymnasium around 1830

At the beginning of the 19th century, a Polish-language teachers' college was organised in the city by Tymoteusz Gizewiusz. Until 1802, students of the local school spoke almost exclusively Polish. In 1813 the school was transformed into a German gymnasium. The position of a Polish teacher remained in place until 1819. In 1820, Fryderyk Tymoteusz Krieger became the superintendent of the school and actively defended the rights of local Poles to use the Polish language. Krieger also prepared Polish educational programs, in opposition to attempts at Germanization by Prussian authorities. He was the first pastor in Masuria to protest against the Germanization of Polish schools in the region. Prussian authorities launched investigations against him three times. Among the students of the local gymnasium was Gustaw Gizewiusz, a relative of Krieger, who became one of the best-known advocates against the Germanisation of Masuria. Polish people who had acquired knowledge of the German language, including children whose parents did not speak German, were officially classified as ethnic Germans by the authorities, and were denied the right to attend Polish church services. In 1825, according to the official statistics, Lyck was inhabited by 1,748 Germans and 1,394 Poles.

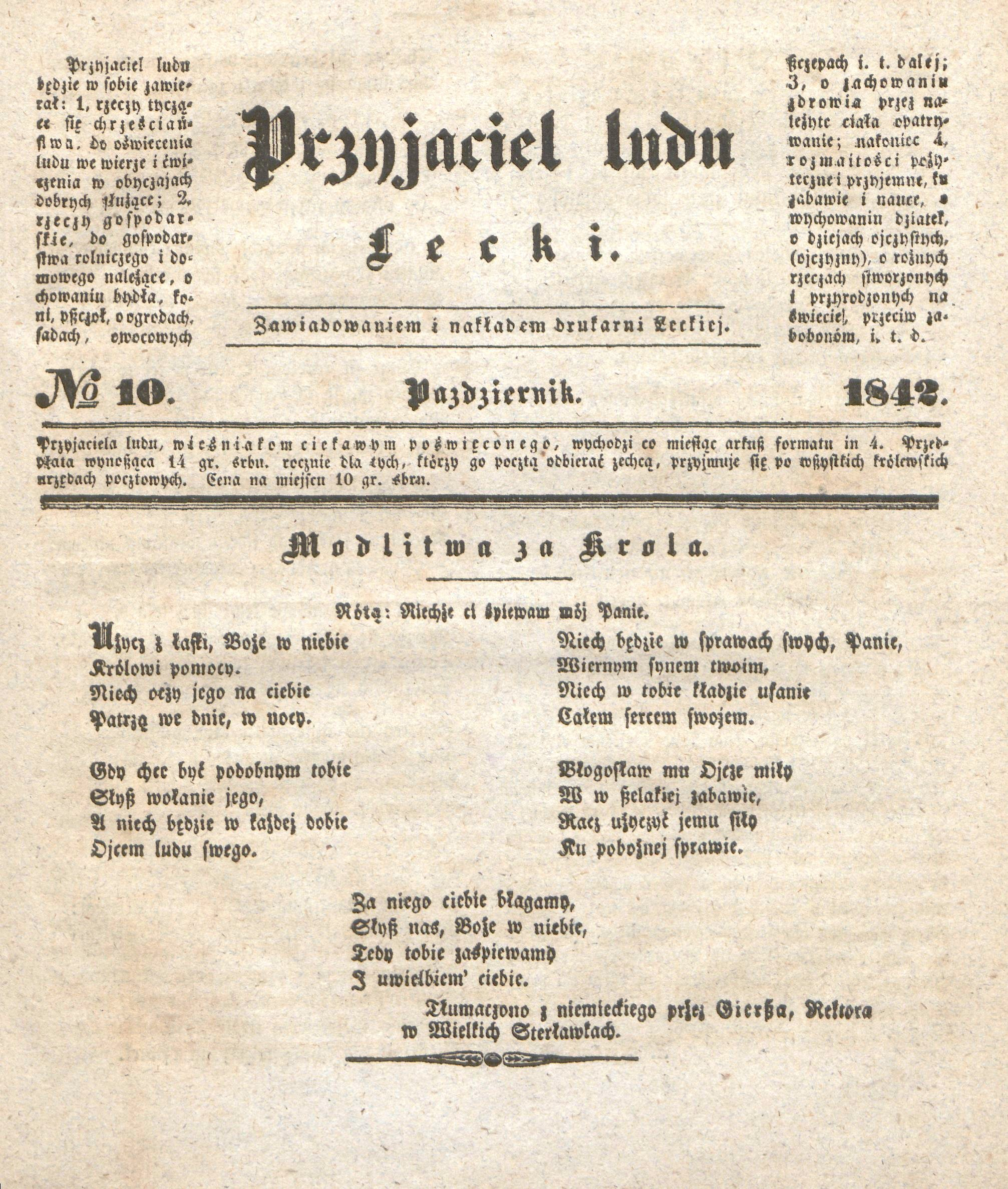
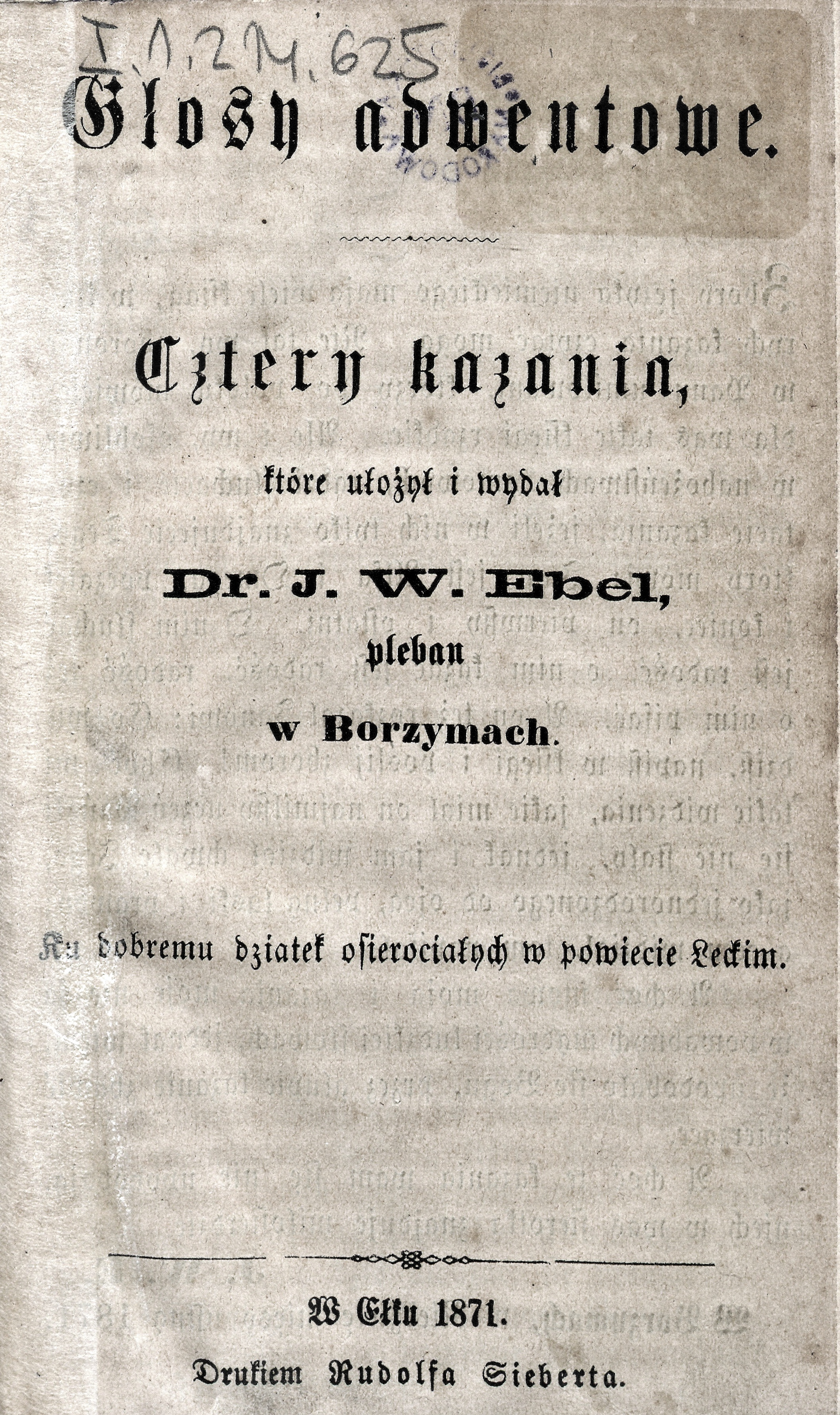
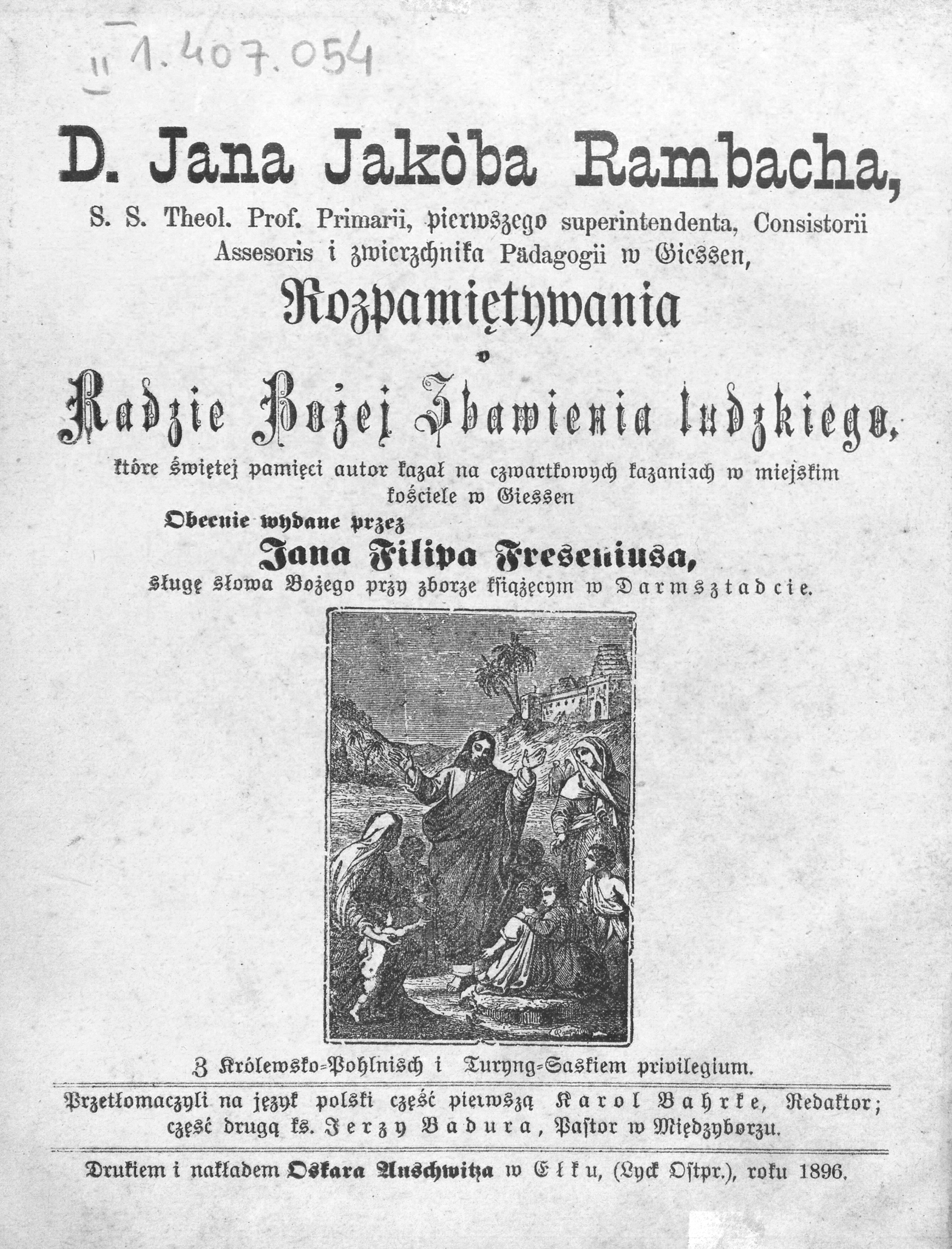
19th-century Polish publications from Ełk

In 1840, the German-language newspaper Lycker gemeinnütziges Unterhaltungsblatt, later called Lycker Zeitung, was founded. Between 1842 and 1845, a Polish newspaper, Przyjaciel Ludu Łecki (Łek's Friend of the People), was printed in the city, whose aim was to resist Germanisation and cultivate Polish folk traditions as well as educate the local rural population. The Polish press faced hindrances from the Prussian administration, while the German press could operate without obstacles.

In May 1845, a Polish resistance movement in the city was organized by Kazmierz Szulc, whose aim was to prepare local Polish youth for an uprising. During the January Uprising, weapons were smuggled through the city to the Russian Partition of Poland, and Polish insurgents fleeing the Russian Partition took refuge in the city; among others, a detachment of Colonel Józef Konstanty Ramotowski passed through it.

In 19th-century Polish encyclopedias and gazetteers the city was noted as Ełk. In the late 19th century it was the largest town of the region (according to data from 1880 and 1890), before being surpassed by Osterode (Ostróda) (according to data from 1905 and 1925).

From 1896 to 1902, Gazeta Ludowa, a Polish-language newspaper, heavily subsidised by banks from Greater Poland representing the Polish national movement in Masuria, was published in the city. It soon faced repression and discrimination from the German authorities which led to its demise; its paid circulation dropped from 357 copies in 1896 to less than 250 at the turn-of-the-century. According to German-American author Richard Blanke, the "demise marked the end of the second major effort by Polish nationalists to establish a journalistic foothold in Masuria".

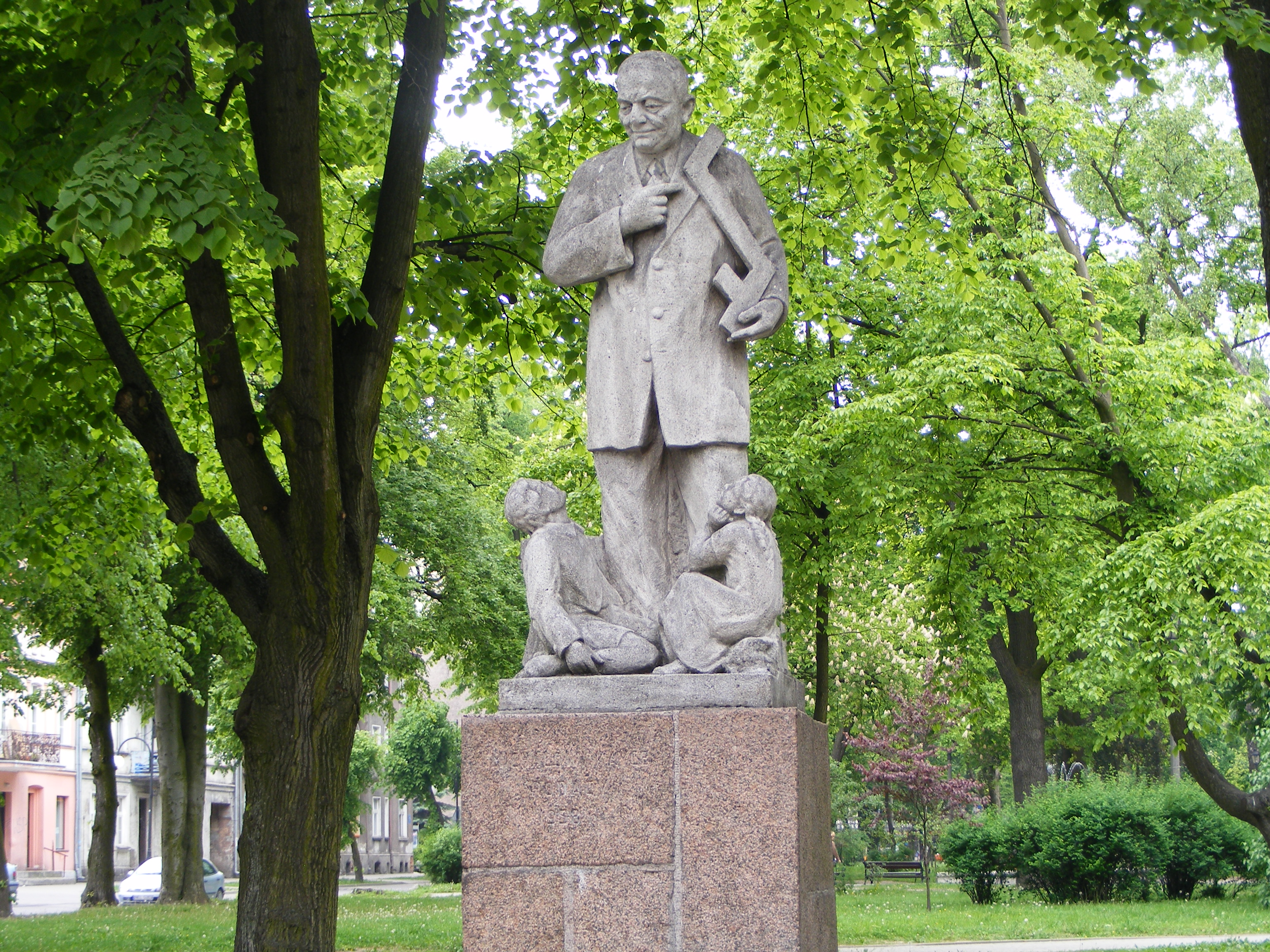
Michał Kajka monument in the Solidarity Park

In 1896, Polish and Masurian activists founded the Masurian People's Party in the city, which sought to resist efforts of German authorities at forced Germanization. The co-founder of the party was poet Michał Kajka, today honoured in Ełk with a monument in the centre of the city. From the start, the party was subject to severe repressions and attacks by Prussian authorities. In the German federal elections, the MPL received 229 votes in 1898 and 20 in 1912 in the Lyck constituency.

=== 20th century ===
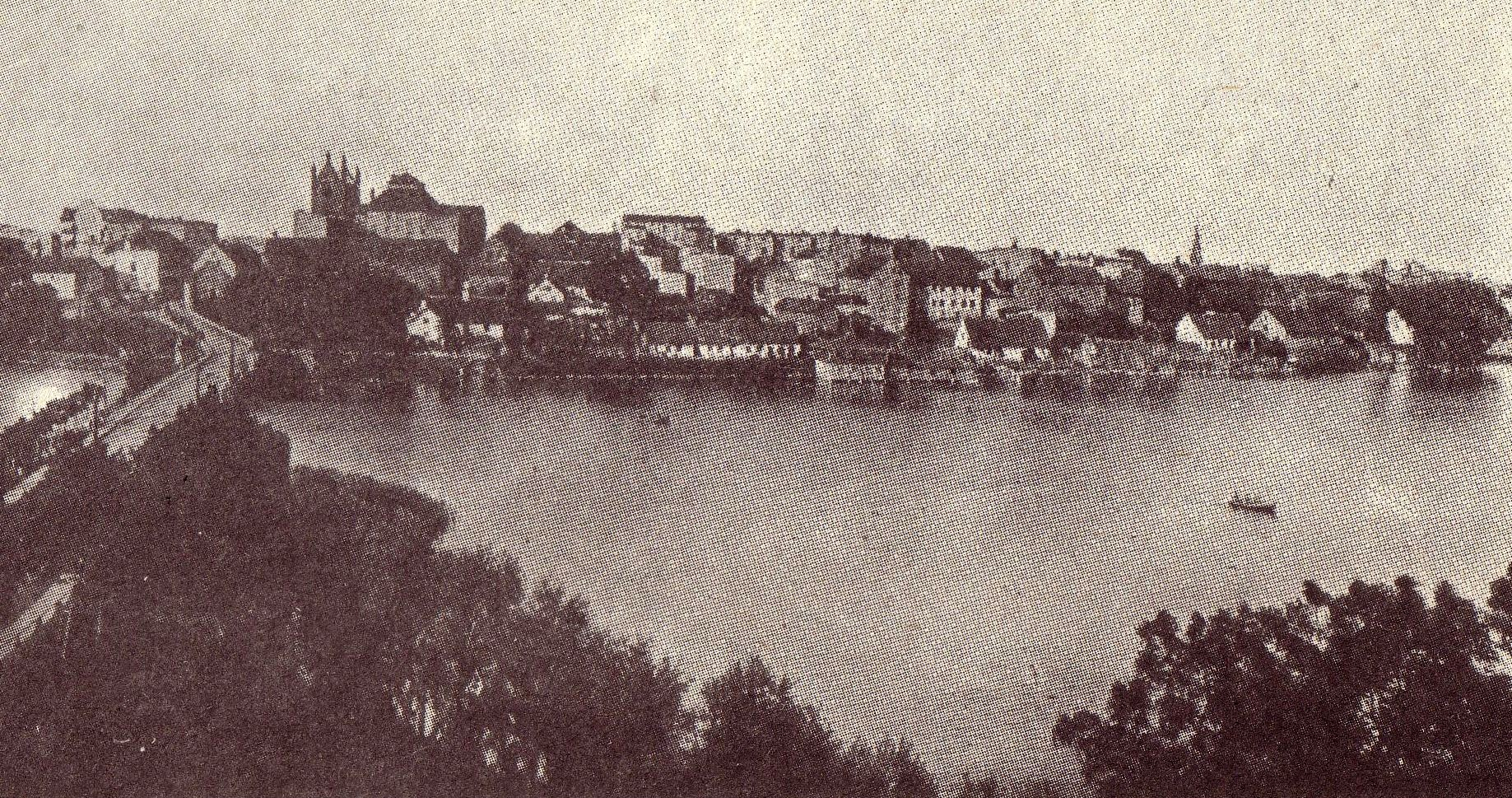
Ełk around 1900

In 1910, Lyck had more than 13,000 inhabitants. Mateusz Siuchniński gives the percentage of Poles in 1900 as 35.7% but warns that the numbers come from lowered German estimates. Many citizens fled during World War I, when Imperial Russian troops attacked the region, but returned after the battles of Tannenberg and the Masurian Lakes. English and Italian troops were deployed in the town after the Treaty of Versailles to supervise the East Prussian plebiscite. Contemporary Polish newspaper articles reported that the Germans vandalized Polish information boards and held an anti-Polish rally at which they encouraged the beating of Poles and the devastation of their homes and property. In April 1920, the German Sicherheitswehr battered Italian soldiers, two fatally. In the plebiscite, 8,339 inhabitants voted for Germany and 8 for Poland, which just regained independence. As a result of the plebiscite, the city remained part of Germany.

During the Polish–Soviet War, on 31 July 1920, some 1,000 Polish soldiers arrived and were soon interned by Germany in nearby Orzysz. In 1922, a Polish consular agency was opened, which was upgraded to a vice-consulate the next year.

It was in Lyck that the first-ever weekly newspaper in the Hebrew language, Hamagid ("the preacher"), was founded in 1856 by Eliezer Lipmann Silbermann, a local rabbi. The paper was eventually moved to Berlin. In Weimar Germany antisemitism became prevalent, which led to persecution of the local Jewish population even before the Nazis took power. An antisemitic publication, Die jüdische Überlegenheit (The Jewish Supremacy), attacking the Jews circulated in 1927 at a local gathering of fascist sympathizers In 1932, the local pharmacist Leo Frankenstein was attacked; a hand grenade was thrown into his home. The wave of antisemitic repressions intensified after Nazis gained power in Germany in 1933 and many local merchants and intellectuals of Jewish descent were arrested. During Kristallnacht, Jewish shops and synagogue were plundered and devastated in the town. Facing these events, several Jews of Lyck decided to escape, some abroad, some to Berlin, others as far as Shanghai Of those Jews who remained, 80 were murdered in various Nazi concentration and death camps.

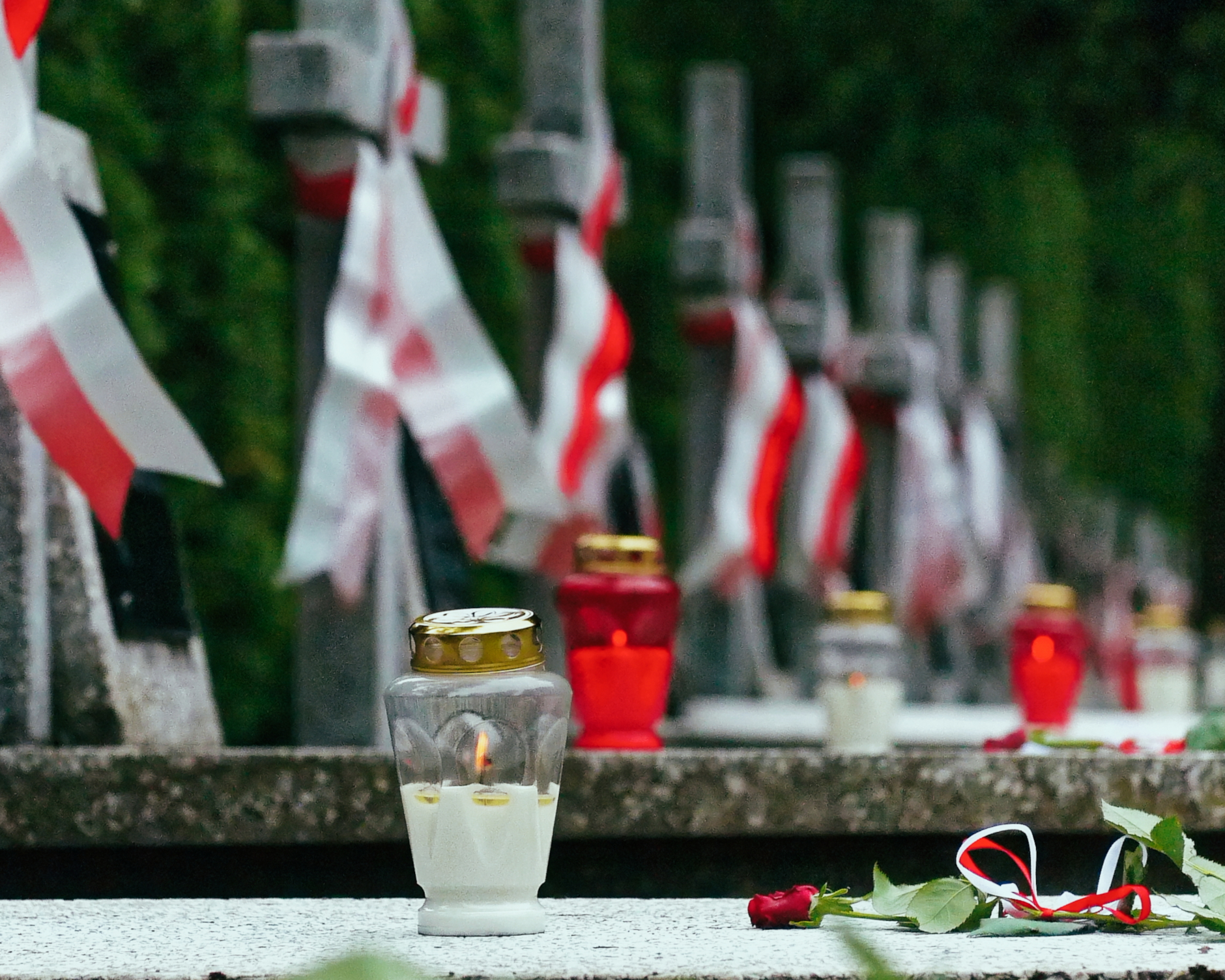
Polish military cemetery from World War II

The city also was the site of German prison camps for Norwegian and Soviet PoWs during World War II. Over 60 Italian PoWs were imprisoned as forced labour in the town. The Polish resistance was active and operated one of the region's main smuggling points for Polish underground press in the city. It was heavily damaged by bombardments. The Soviet Army approached in January 1945. The city was placed under Polish administration in April 1945 and the remaining German inhabitants were expelled in accordance with the Potsdam Agreement. It was rebuilt and its modern Polish name Ełk was confirmed as official.

=== Contemporary times ===
In 1999, Ełk was visited by Pope John Paul II. About 300,000 people attended a papal Mass.

In 2017, the anti-Muslim Ełk riots occurred after a fatal stabbing of a 21-year-old man by a Muslim kebab cook. Several hundred men surrounded the Prince Kebab restaurant, tossing firecrackers, stones, and Molotov cocktails at the shop. Police initially stood by and did not intervene for several hours; however, when they did intervene the crowd turned against them as well. Following the riots in Ełk, other attacks on kebab restaurants took place throughout Poland.

In 2018, on the occasion of the 100th anniversary of Poland's independence, a monument to Józef Piłsudski was erected in front of the town hall. The Marshal of Poland was also honored with a mural on one of the townhouses in the city center.

== Population ==
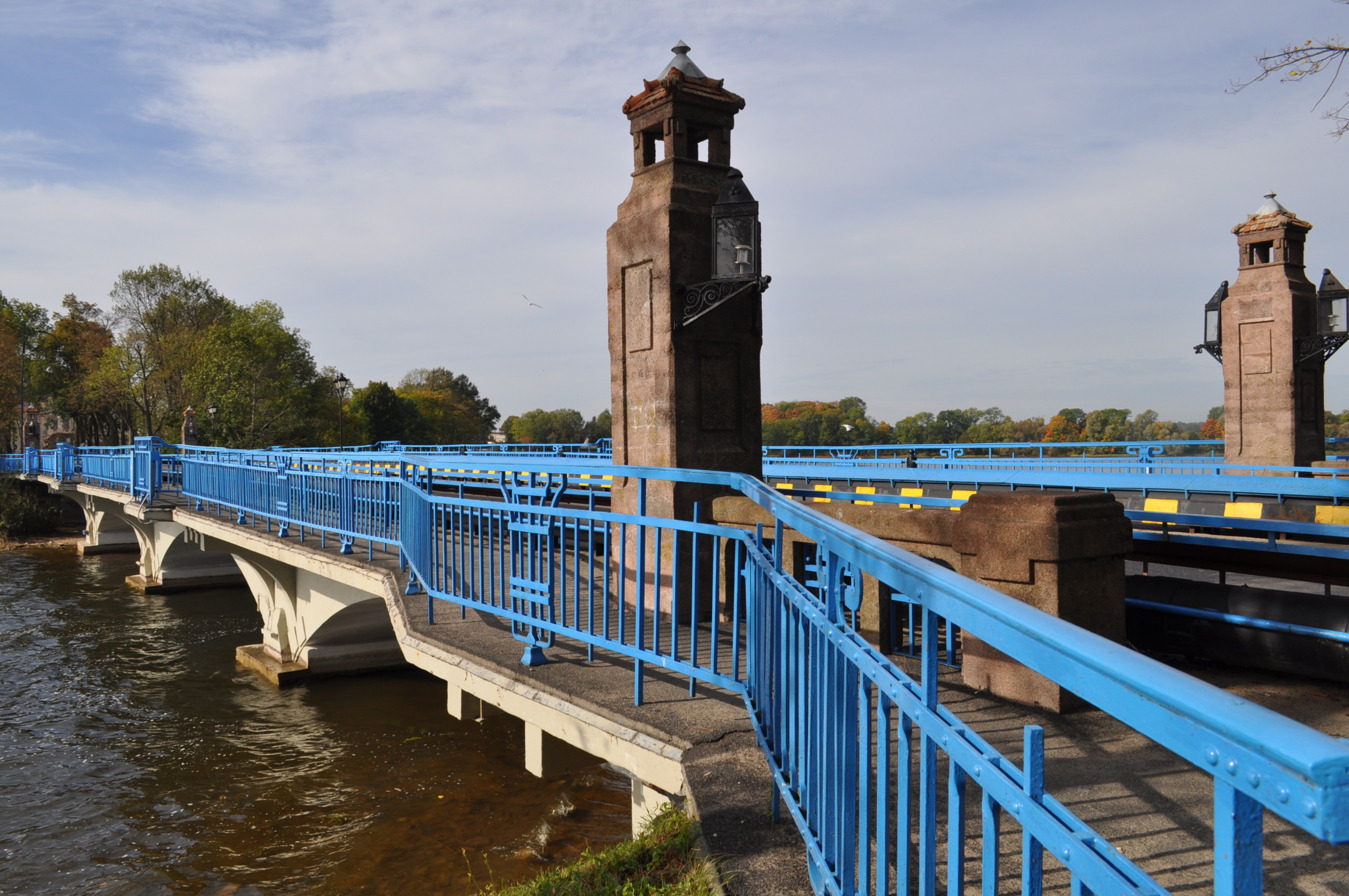
Historical bridge on the Ełk Lake, connecting the city with Castle Island

=== Number of inhabitants by year ===
Historical population

Year	Pop.	±%
1499	600	—
1600	800	+33.3%
1782	2,000	+150.0%
1816 (est.)	2,700	+35.0%
1831	2,945	+9.1%
1843	3,397	+15.3%
1875	5,912	+74.0%

Year	Pop.	±%
1880	6,846	+15.8%
1890	9,981	+45.8%
1900	11,386	+14.1%
1910	13,428	+17.9%
1925	15,159	+12.9%
1933	15,520	+2.4%
1939	16,482	+6.2%

Year	Pop.	±%
1950	13,665	−17.1%
1960	21,952	+60.6%
2010	61,156	+178.6%
2011	59,274	−3.1%
2017	61,523	+3.8%

Note that the above table is based on primary, possibly biased, sources:

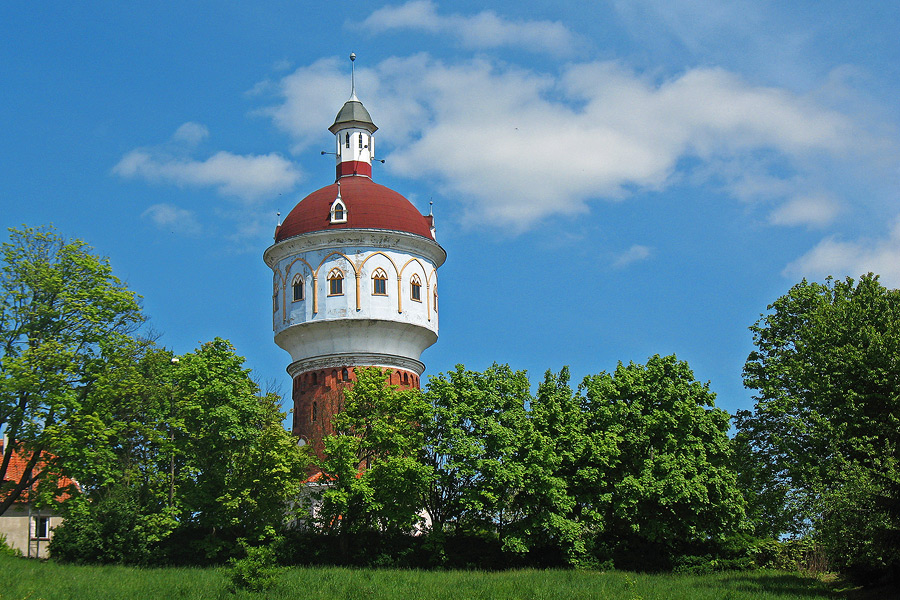
The water tower, built in 1895

== Districts ==
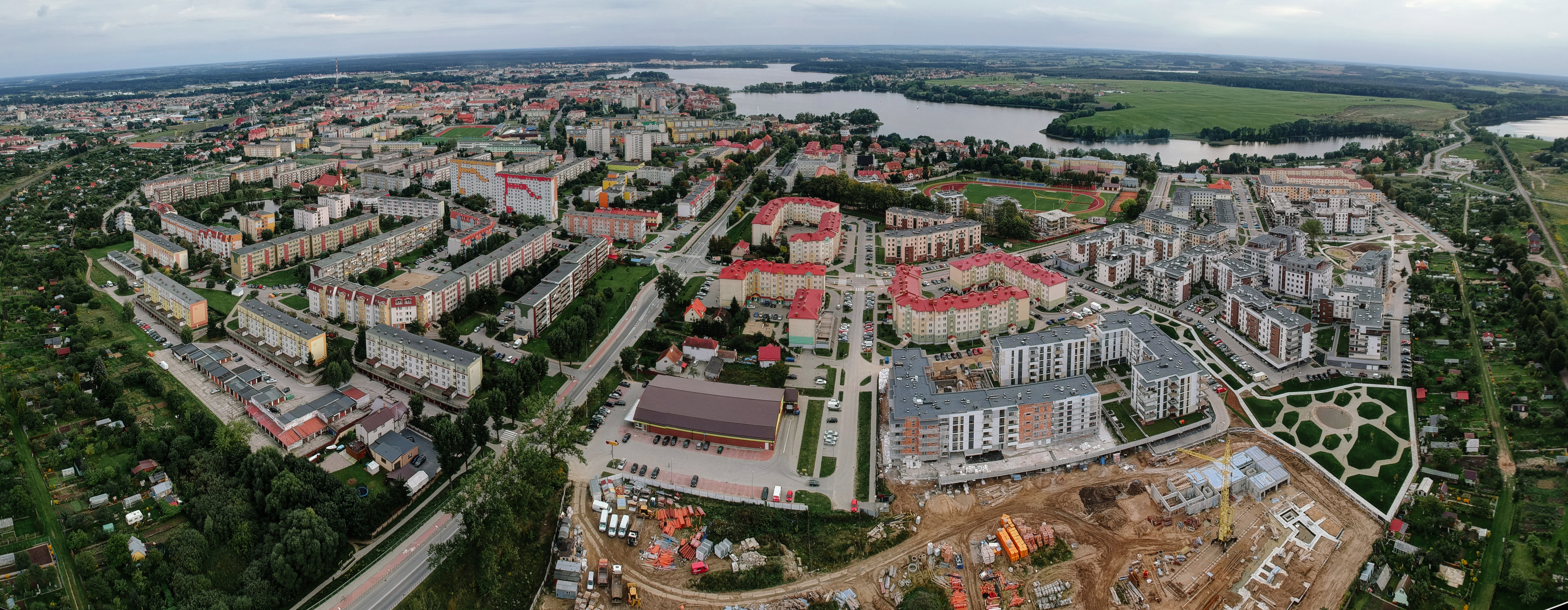
Northern neighbourhoods of Północ II and Osiedle Tuwima

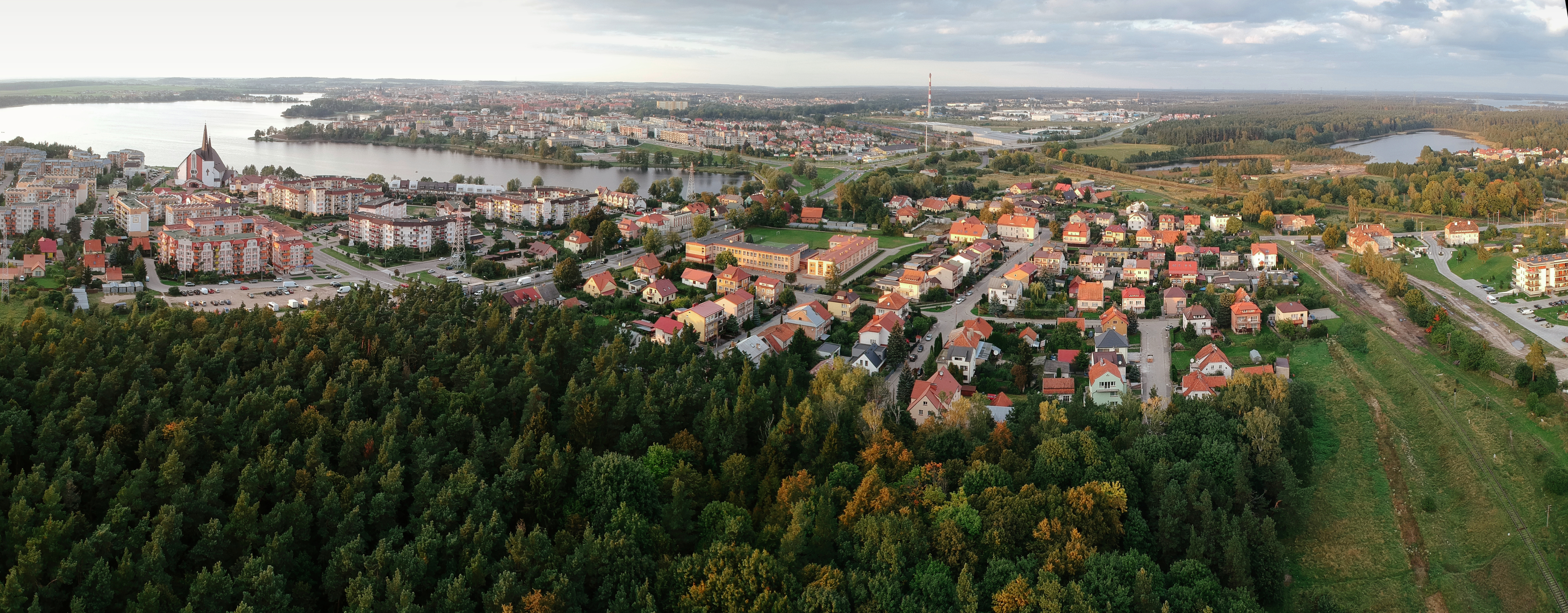
Southern neighbourhoods of Jeziorna and Szyba

The city of Ełk is divided into 14 administrative units, known in Polish as osiedla:

- Baranki
- Centrum
- Jeziorna
- Konieczki
- Osiedle Bogdanowicza
- Osiedle Grunwaldzkie
- Osiedle Kochanowskiego
- Osiedle Tuwima
- Osiedle Wczasowe
- Pod Lasem
- Północ I
- Północ II
- Szyba
- Zatorze

== Mayors ==
- Adam Puza (1990–1994)
- Zdzisław Fadrowski (1994–2002)
- Janusz Nowakowski (2002–2006)
- Tomasz Andrukiewicz (since 2006)

== Education ==
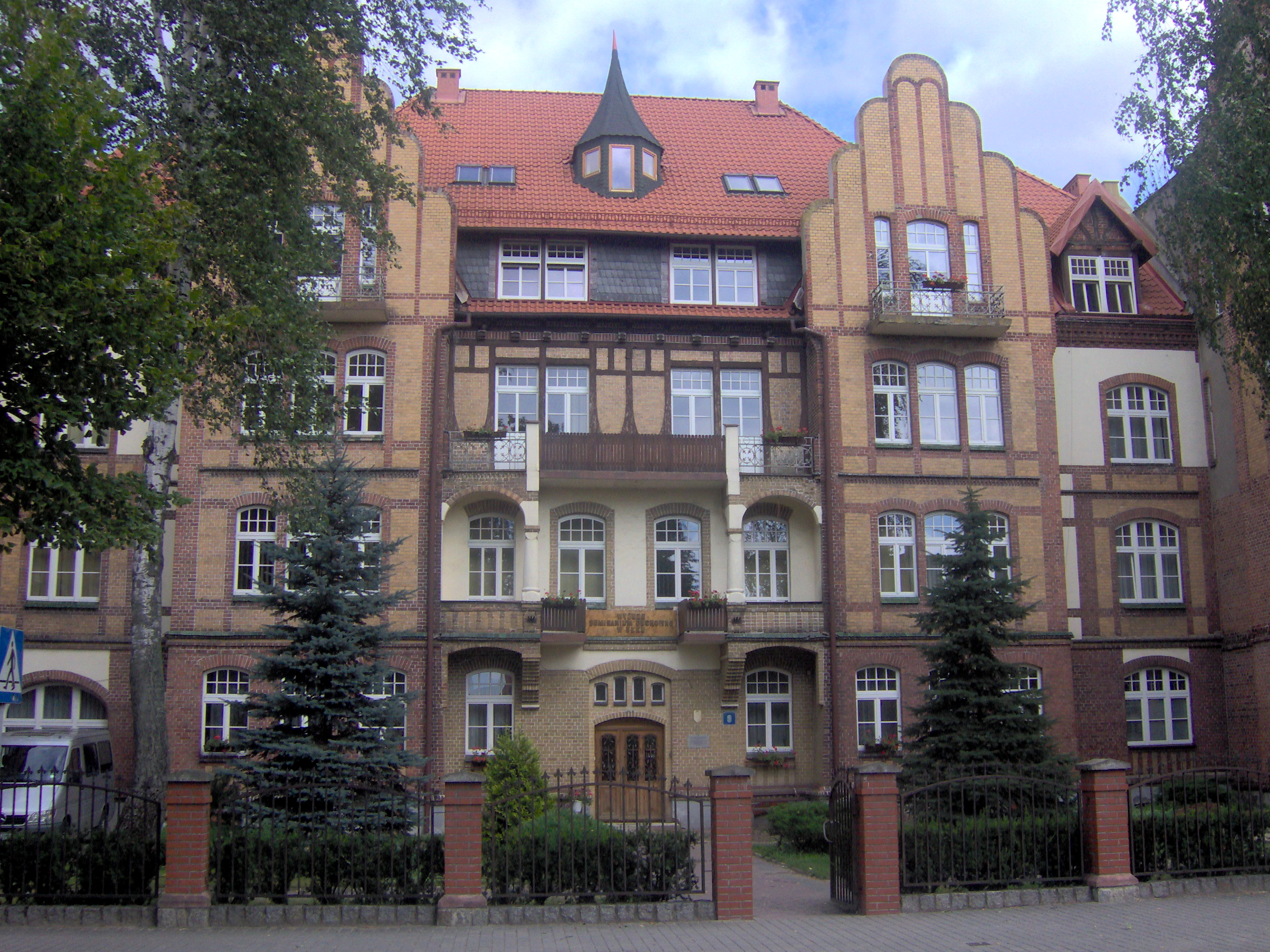
Higher Catholic Seminary

- Private Economic Academy
- Nursery School
- Higher Catholic Seminary

=== High schools ===
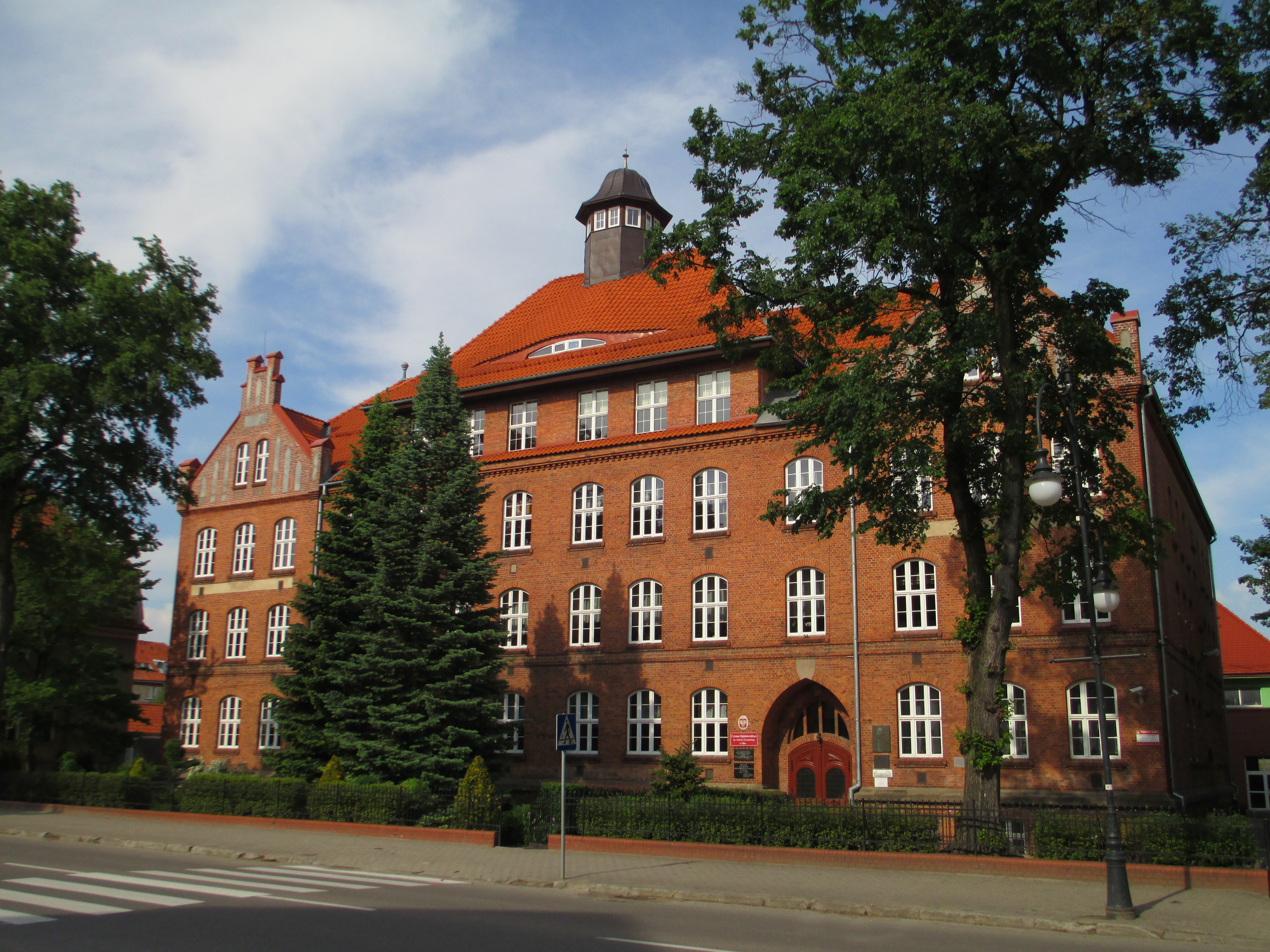
High school No. 1 in Ełk

- Zespół Szkół Ekonomicznych
- Zespół Szkół Mechaniczno - Elektrycznych
- Zespół Szkół nr 1
- Zespół Szkół nr 2 im. K. K. Baczyńskiego (swww)
- Zespół Szkół nr 3 im. J. H. Małeckich (www)
- I Liceum Ogólnokształcące im. S. Żeromskiego (www)
- Zespół Szkół Rolniczych im. M. Rataja
- Zespół Szkół Samorządowych
- Zespół Szkół nr.6 im. M. Rataja (www)

== Sports ==
Local sports clubs include football club Mazur Ełk, boxing club Mazur Ełk, cycling club LUKK Ełk, judo club MKS Żak Ełk and basketball club Wilki Ełk.

The Polish Cyclo-cross Championships were held in Ełk in 1998, 2005 and 2012.

== Religion ==
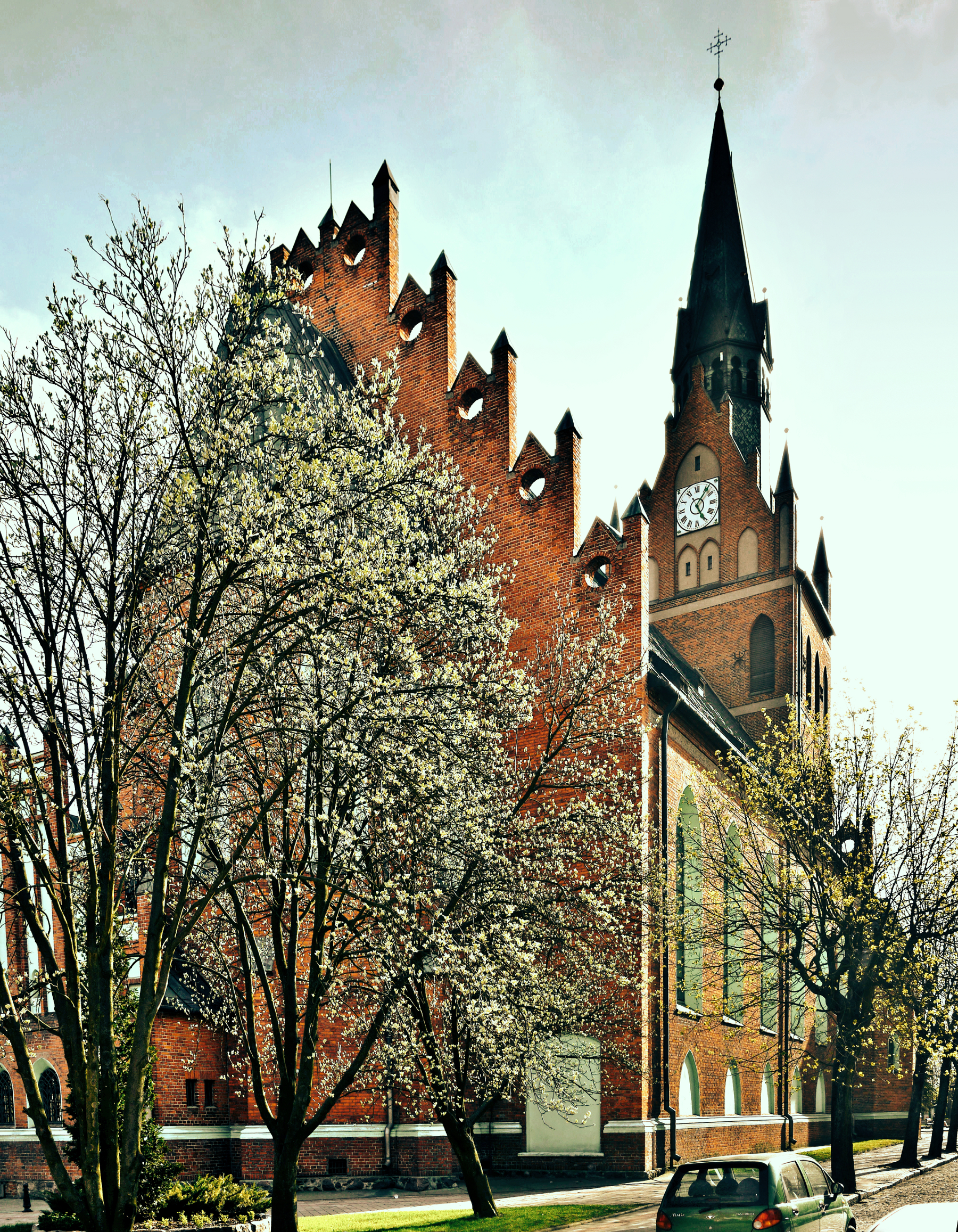
Sacred Heart Church in Ełk

Since the medieval Christianization of the region, the city's population was Roman Catholic, and after the Reformation, it was almost entirely Lutheran until World War II. After the war, the main religion in Ełk became again Roman Catholicism, although a number of Protestant churches are also represented and play an important role in the religious life of the population. These include the Methodist, Baptist, Pentecostal (Assemblies of God – Kościół Zielonoświątkowy) and other churches. Ełk is the center of the Catholic Diocese of Ełk with its bishop Jerzy Mazur.

== International relations ==
=== Twin towns and sister cities ===
Ełk is twinned with:

- Galatone, Italy
- Lørenskog, Norway
- Nettetal, Germany
- Alytus, Lithuania
- Orbassano, Italy

Former twin towns:

- (Russia) Ozyorsk, Russian Federation
- Lida, Belarus

In March 2022, Ełk ended its partnership with the Russian city of Ozyorsk as a reaction to the 2022 Russian invasion of Ukraine.

== Coat of arms ==
Old coat of arms

The current coat of arms of Ełk were adopted in 1999, after the town was visited by the Pope John Paul II. The colors have been changed (from green to yellow), the deer is different than in the former emblem. Lastly is the addition of the insignia of the papacy.

Until 1967, a different emblem with the two-faced head of the god Janus was used, but its origin is unknown.

== Notable people ==
- Arthur Ludwich (1840–1920), German classical philologist who specialized in Homeric studies
- Charles Edward Moldenke (1860–1935), American Lutheran minister and Egyptologist
- Theodor Simon Flatau (1860–1937), German physician
- Karol Bahrke (1868–1935), Polish activist, journalist and book publisher
- Otto von Schrader (1888–1945), German admiral
- Theodor Horydczak (1889–1971), American photographer
- Alfred Müller (1905–1959), German middle-distance runner, competed in the 1928 Summer Olympics
- Kurt Symanzik (1923–1983), German physicist
- Siegfried Lenz (1926–2014), German author; honorary citizen of Ełk since 2011.
- Klaus Gerwien (1940–2018), German soccer player
- Leszek Błażyński (1949–1992), Polish boxer
- Roman Czepe (born 1956), Polish politician
- Andrzej Zgutczyński (born 1958), Polish footballer
- Dariusz Zgutczyński (born 1965), Polish footballer
- Cezary Zamana (born 1967), Polish cyclist
- Paweł Sobolewski (born 1979), Polish footballer
- Tomasz Abramowicz (born 1979), Polish footballer
- Marek Bujło (born 1993), Polish mixed martial artist

== Gallery ==
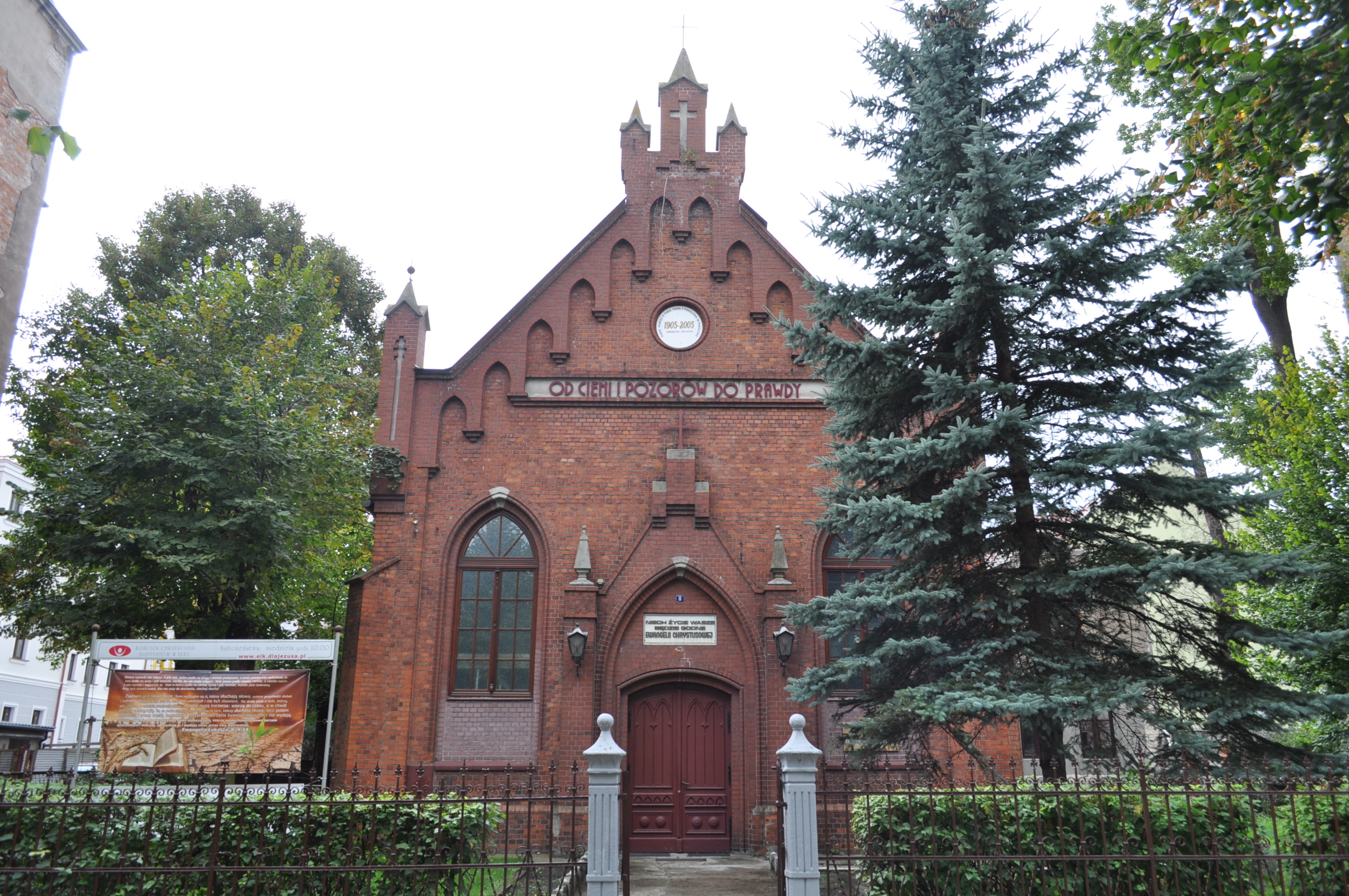
Baptist church

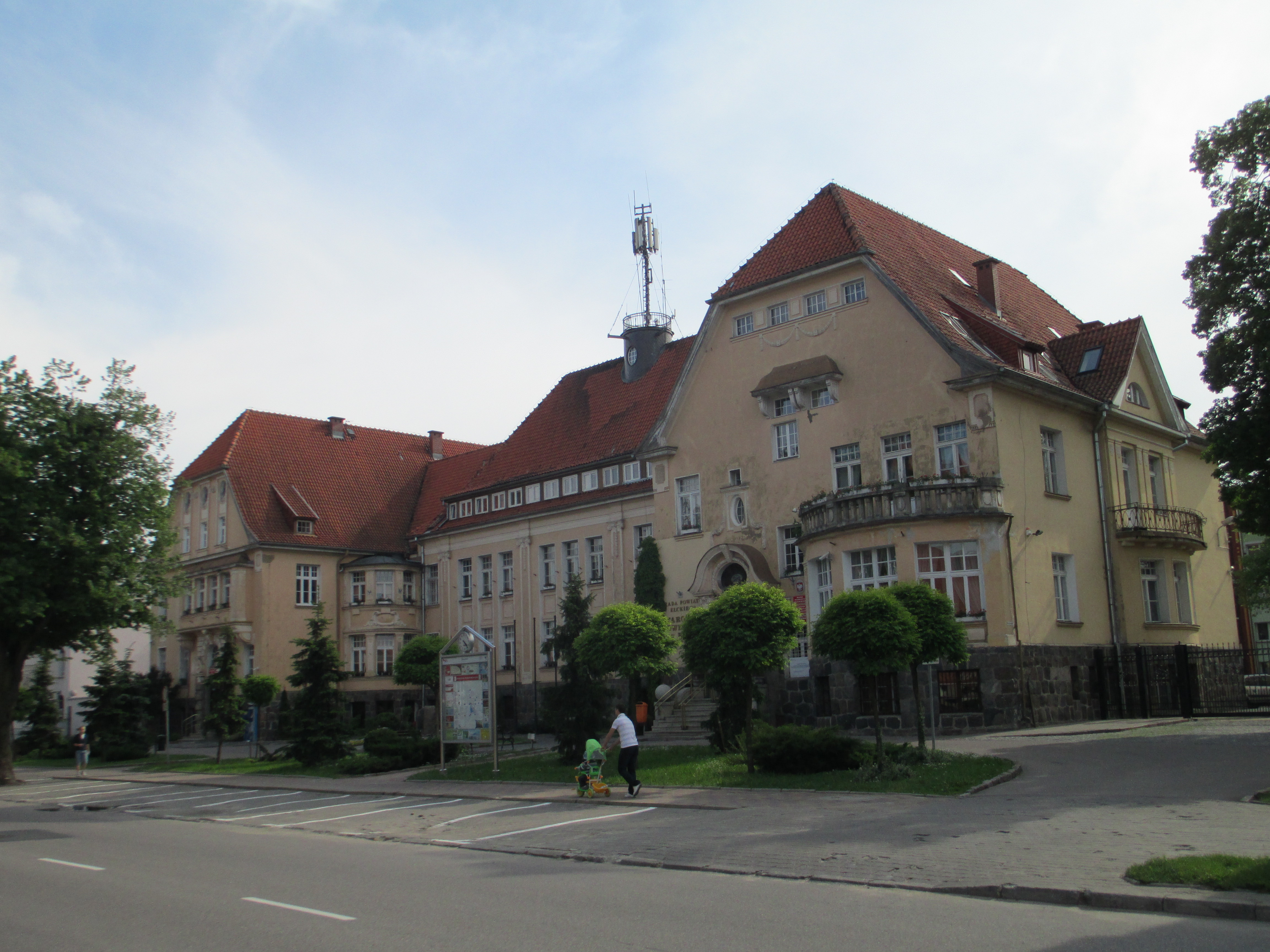
Town hall

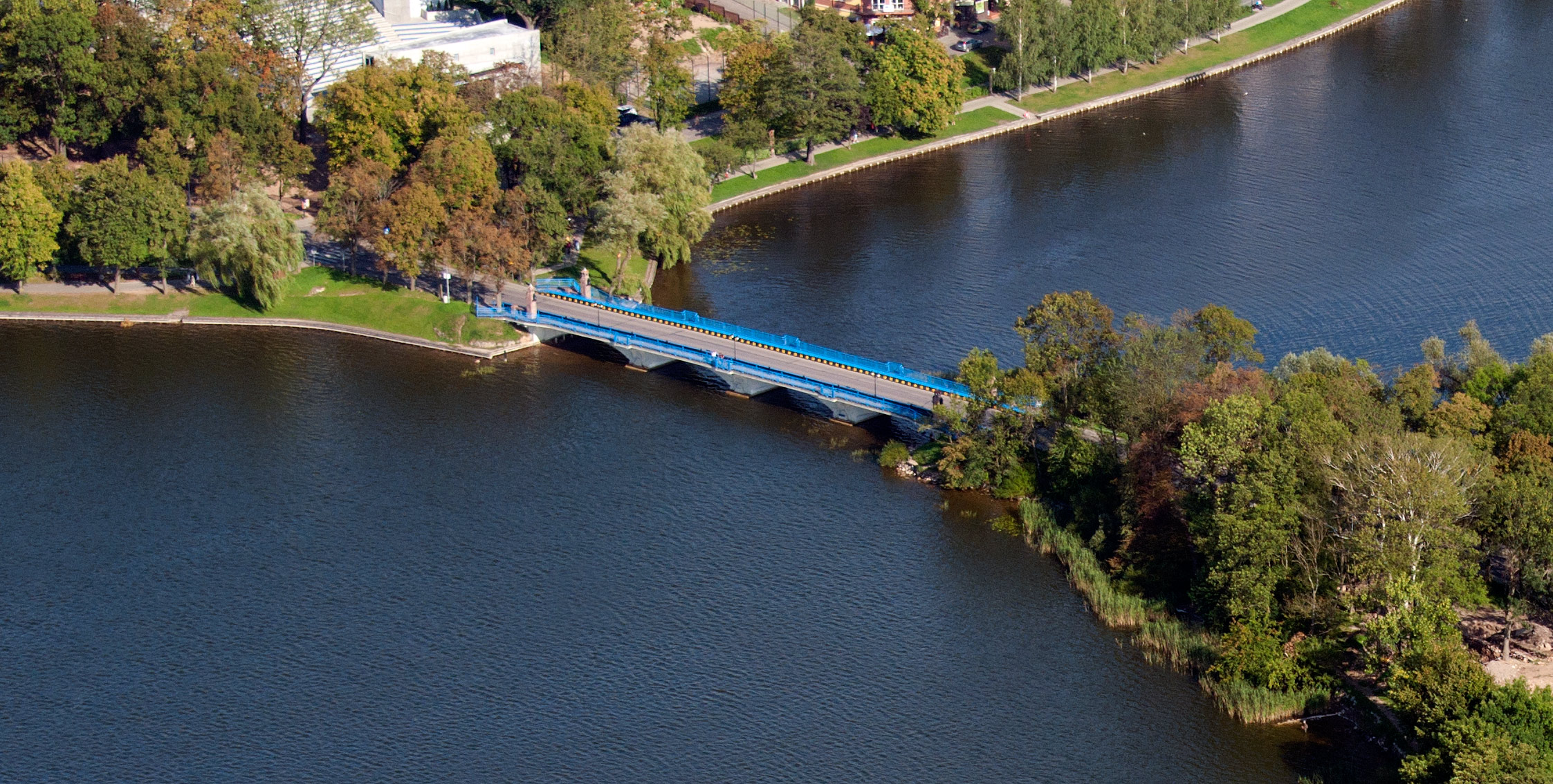
Bridge on the Ełk Lake

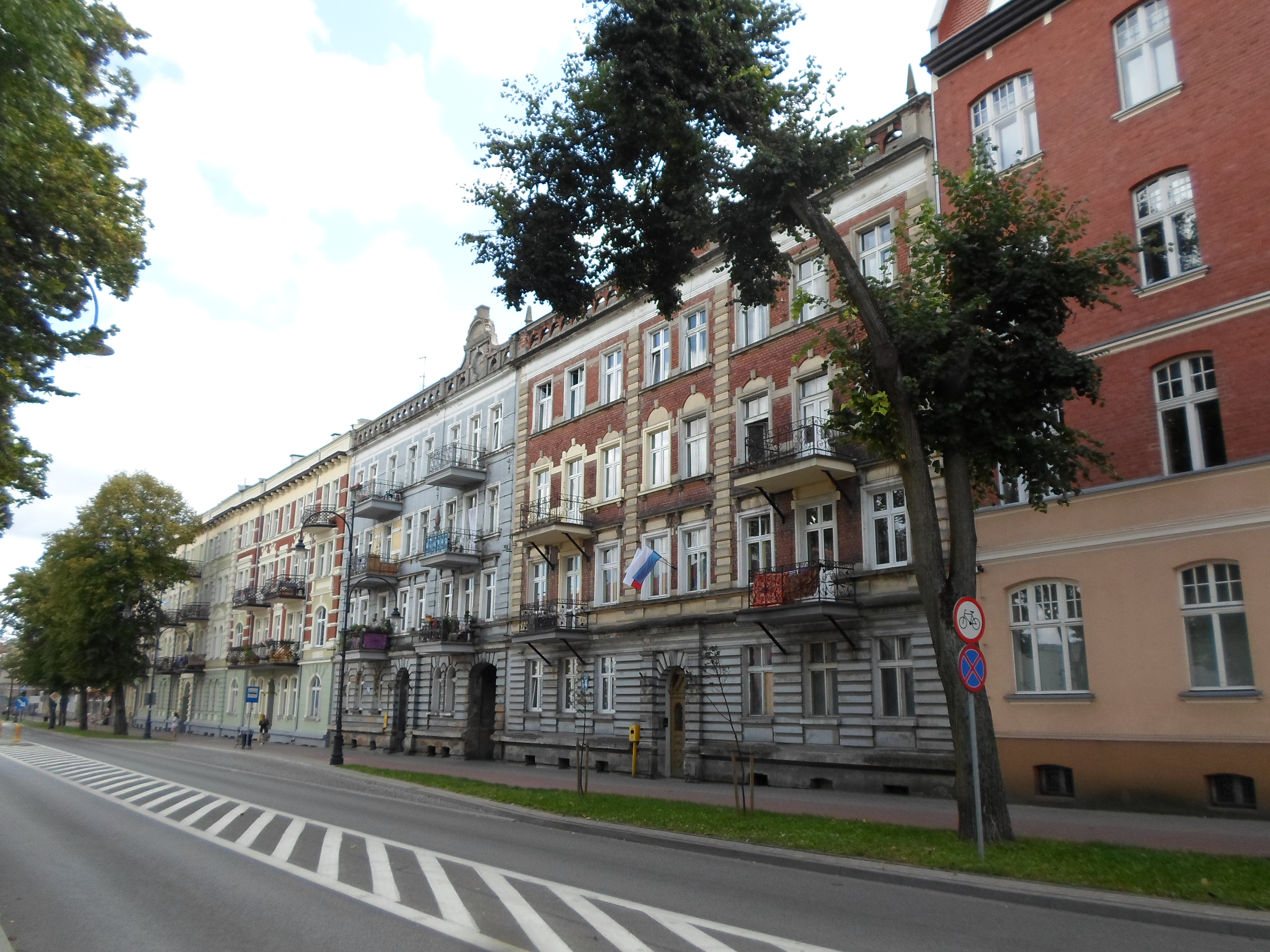
Elaborate tenement houses on Mickiewicz Street

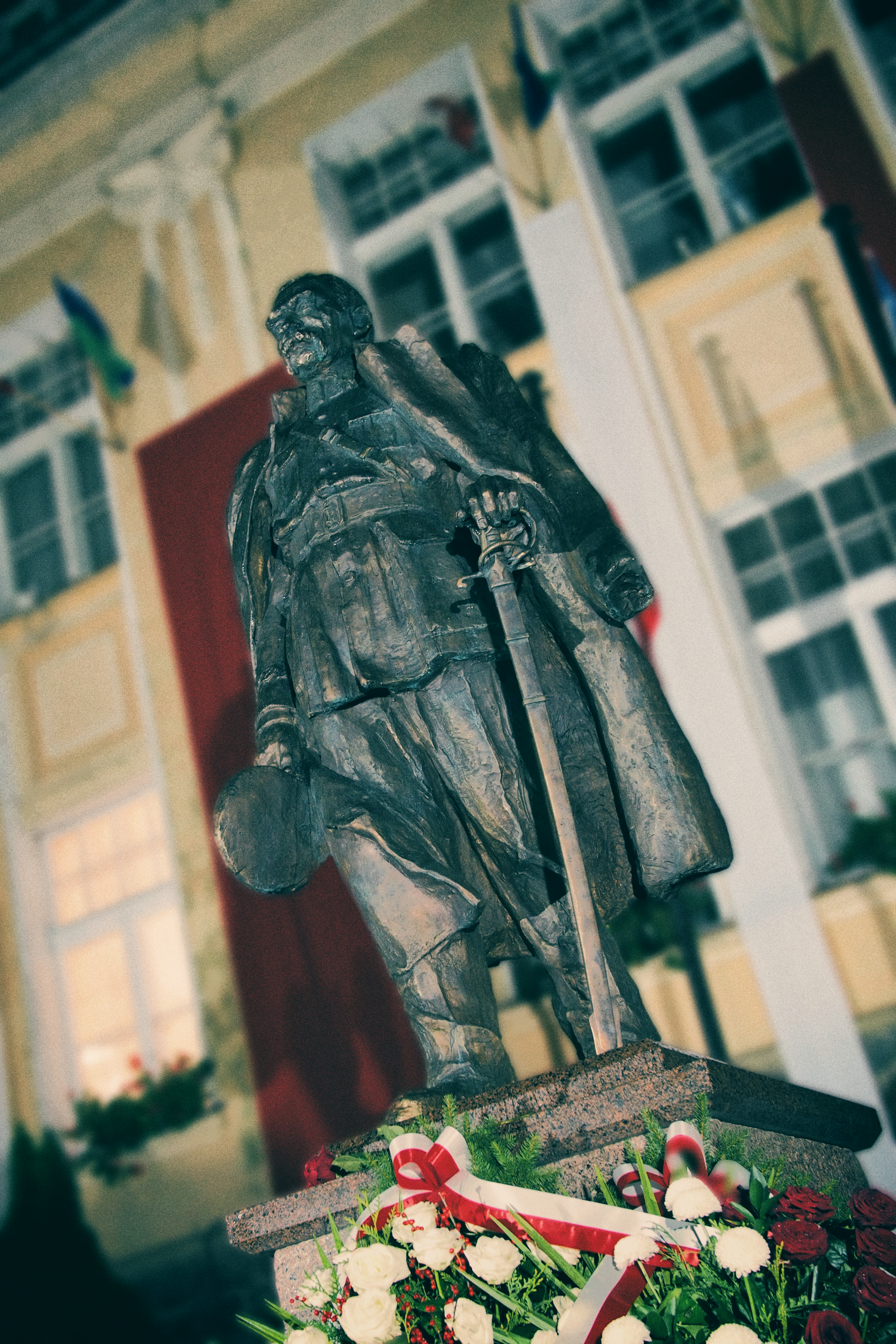
Józef Piłsudski monument

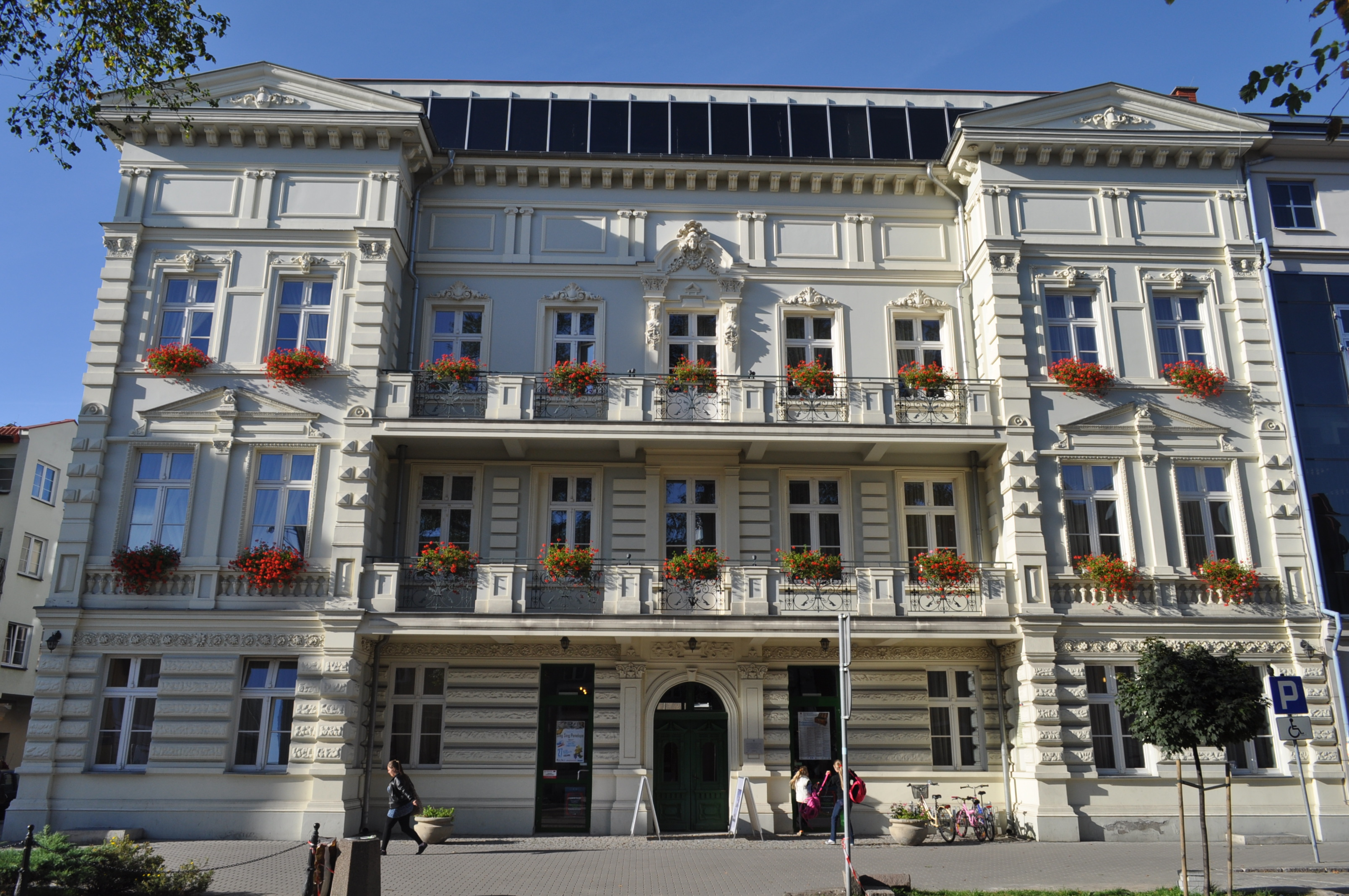
Art School

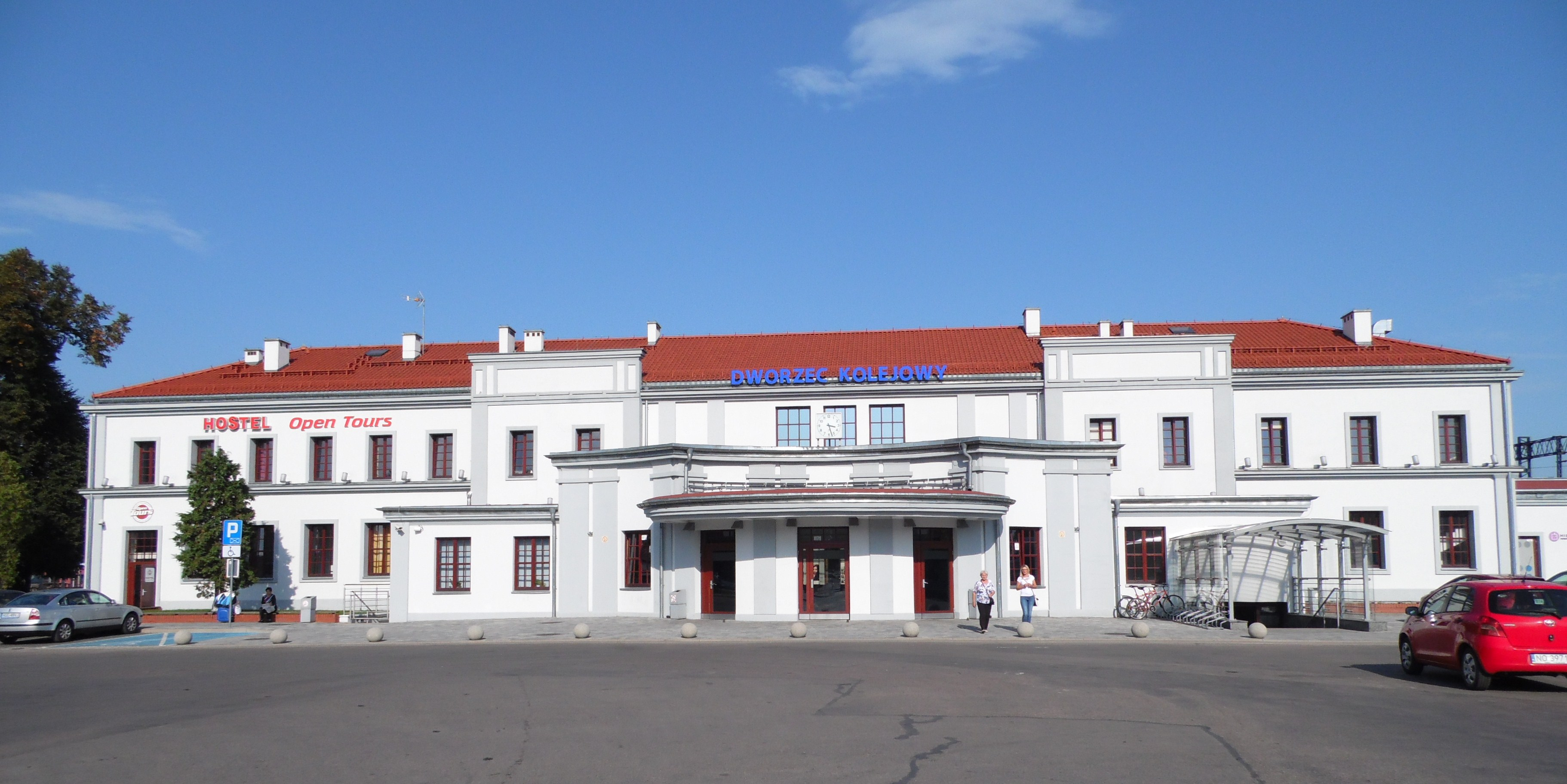
Ełk railway station

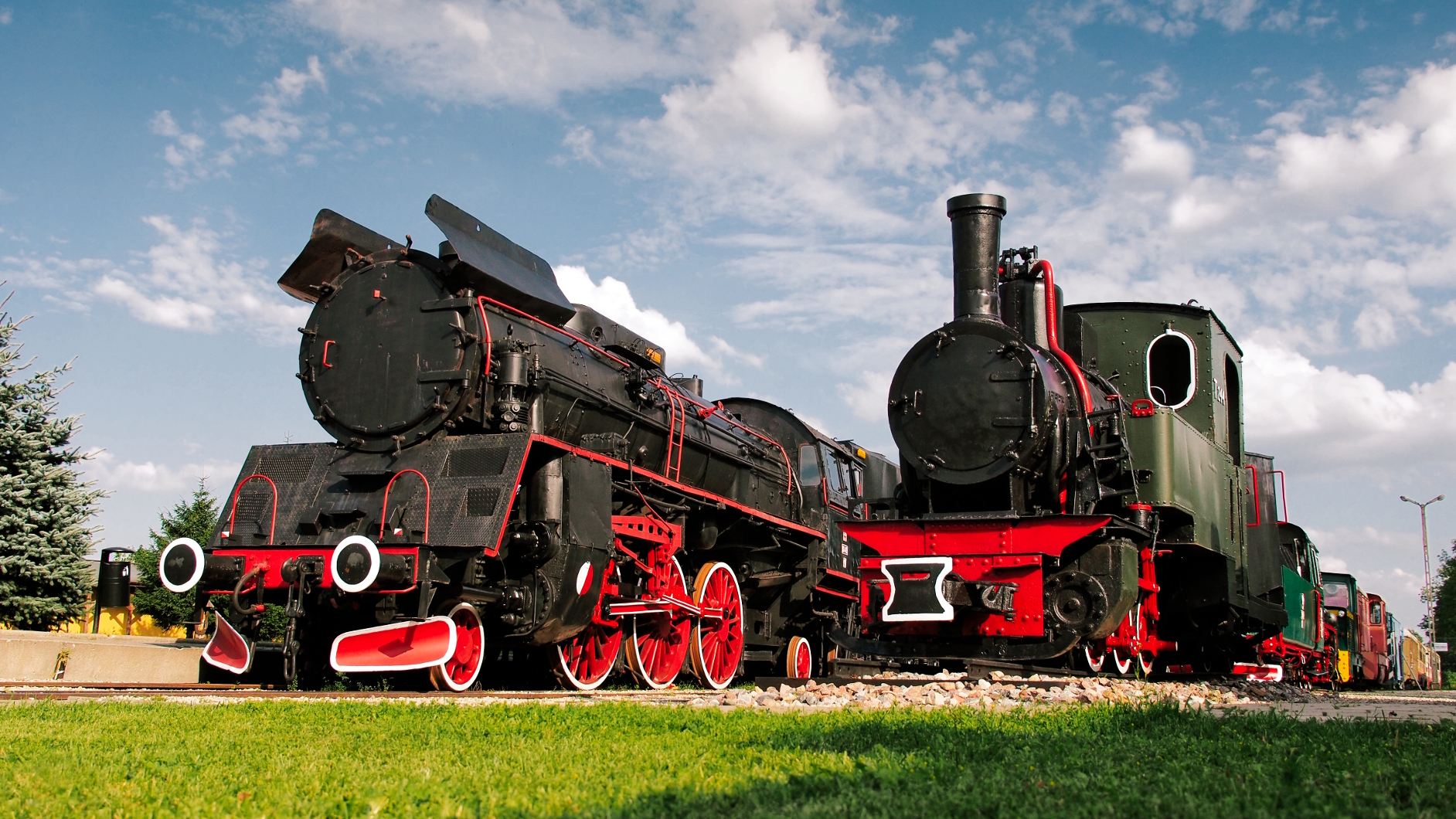
The Ełk narrow-gauge railway station

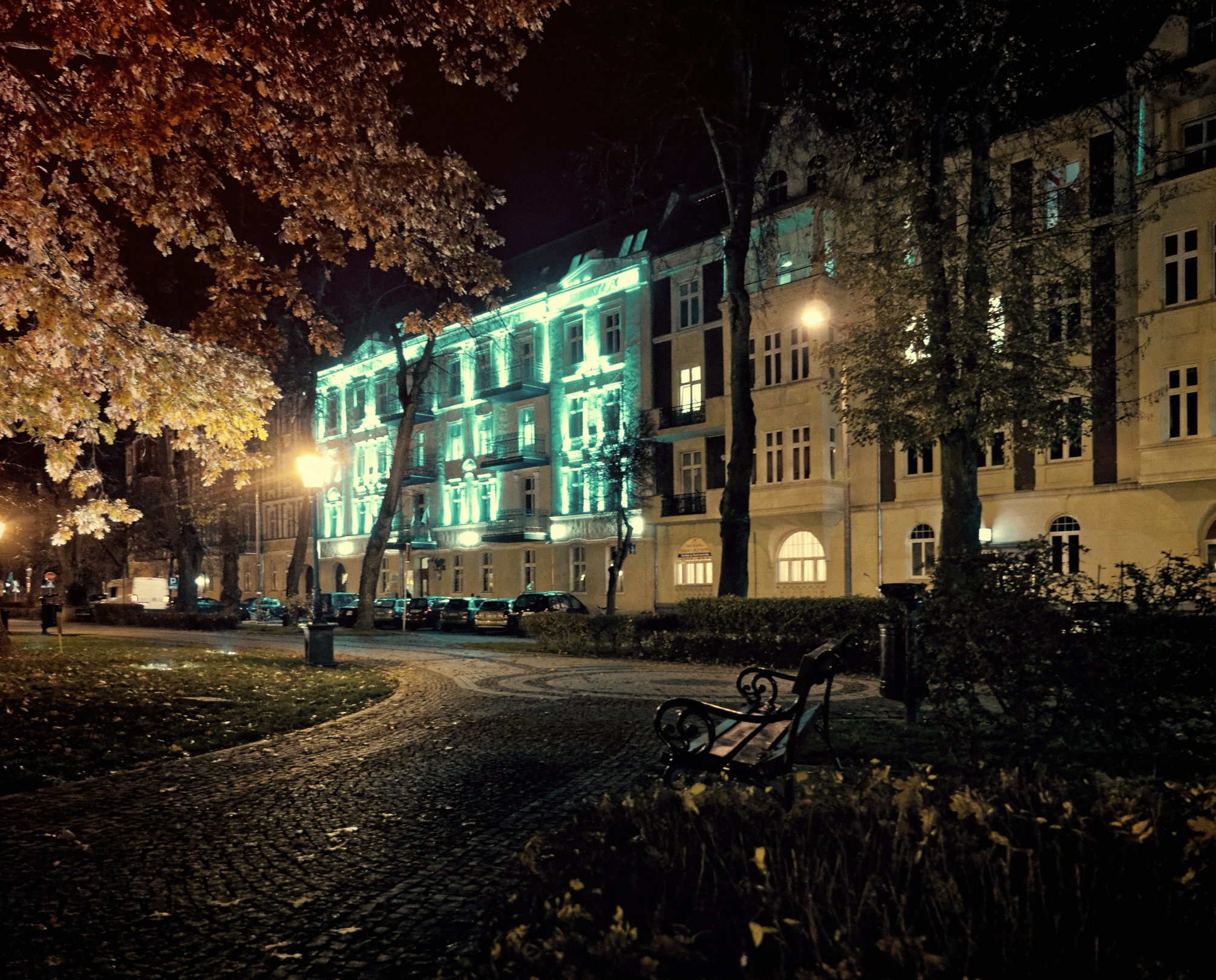
Solidarity Park at night

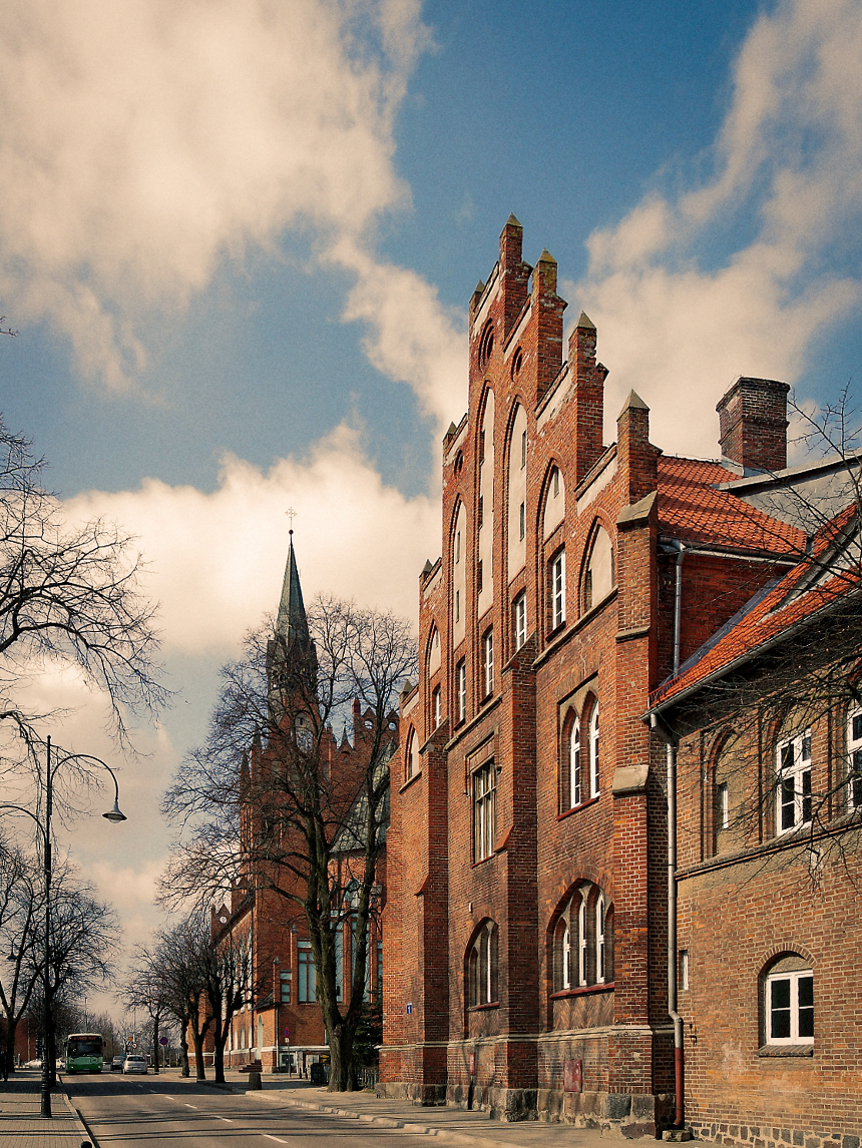
Technical school

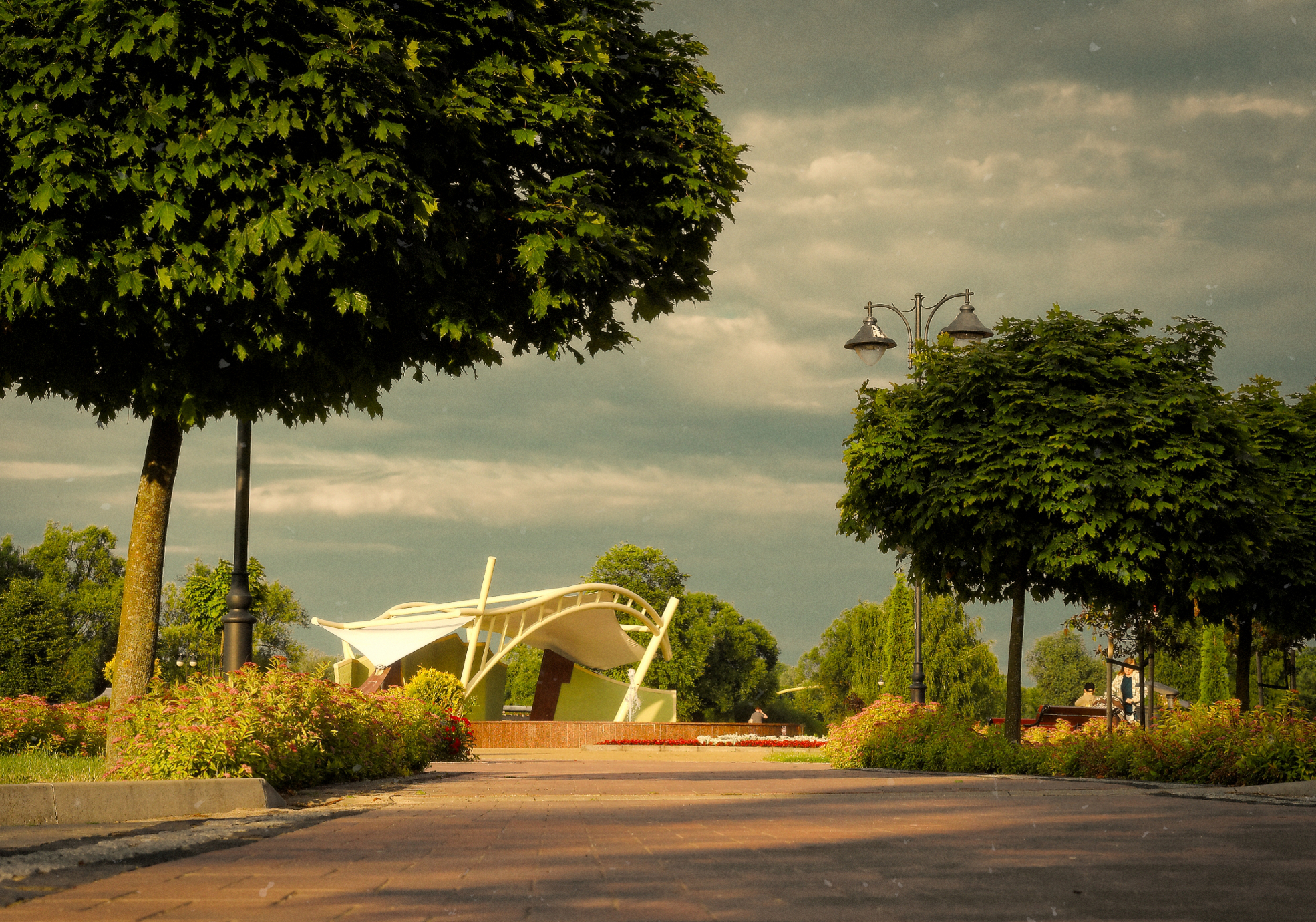
John Paul II Square

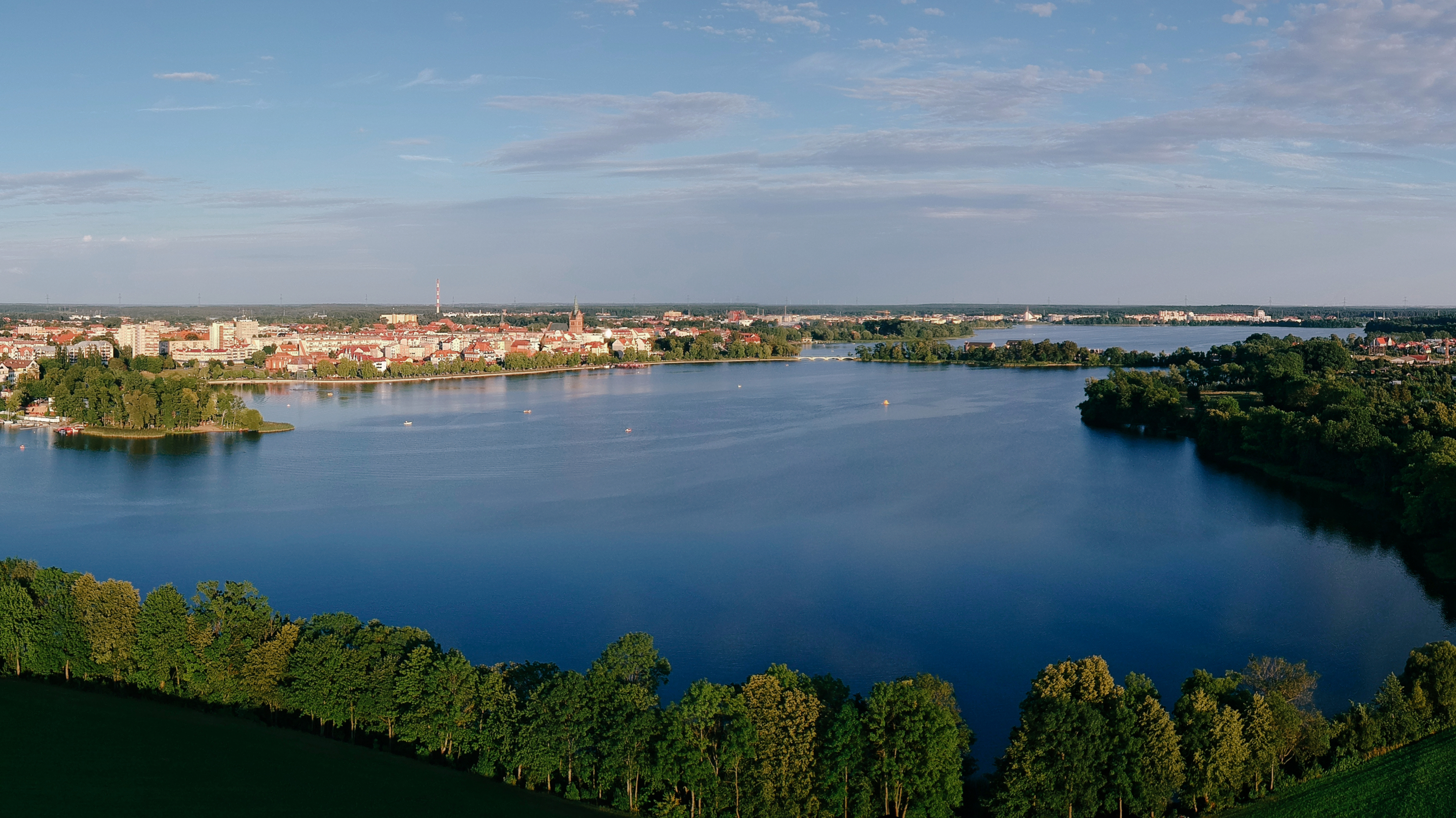
Ełk Lake

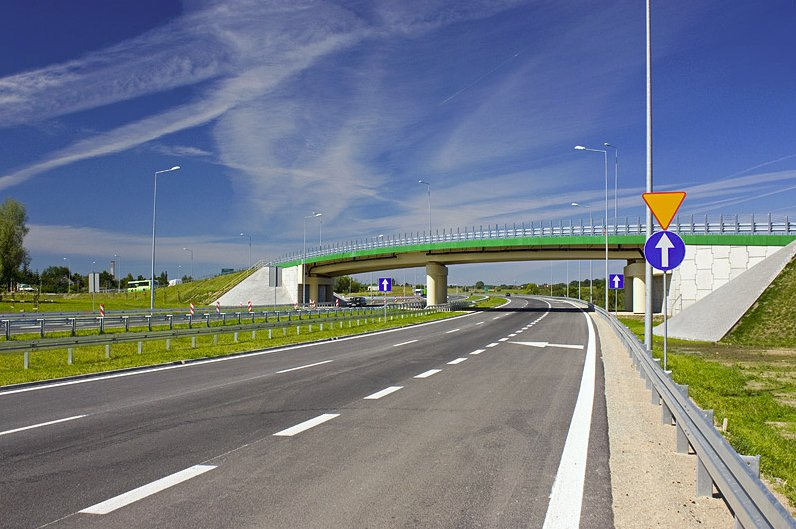
Ełk bypass route

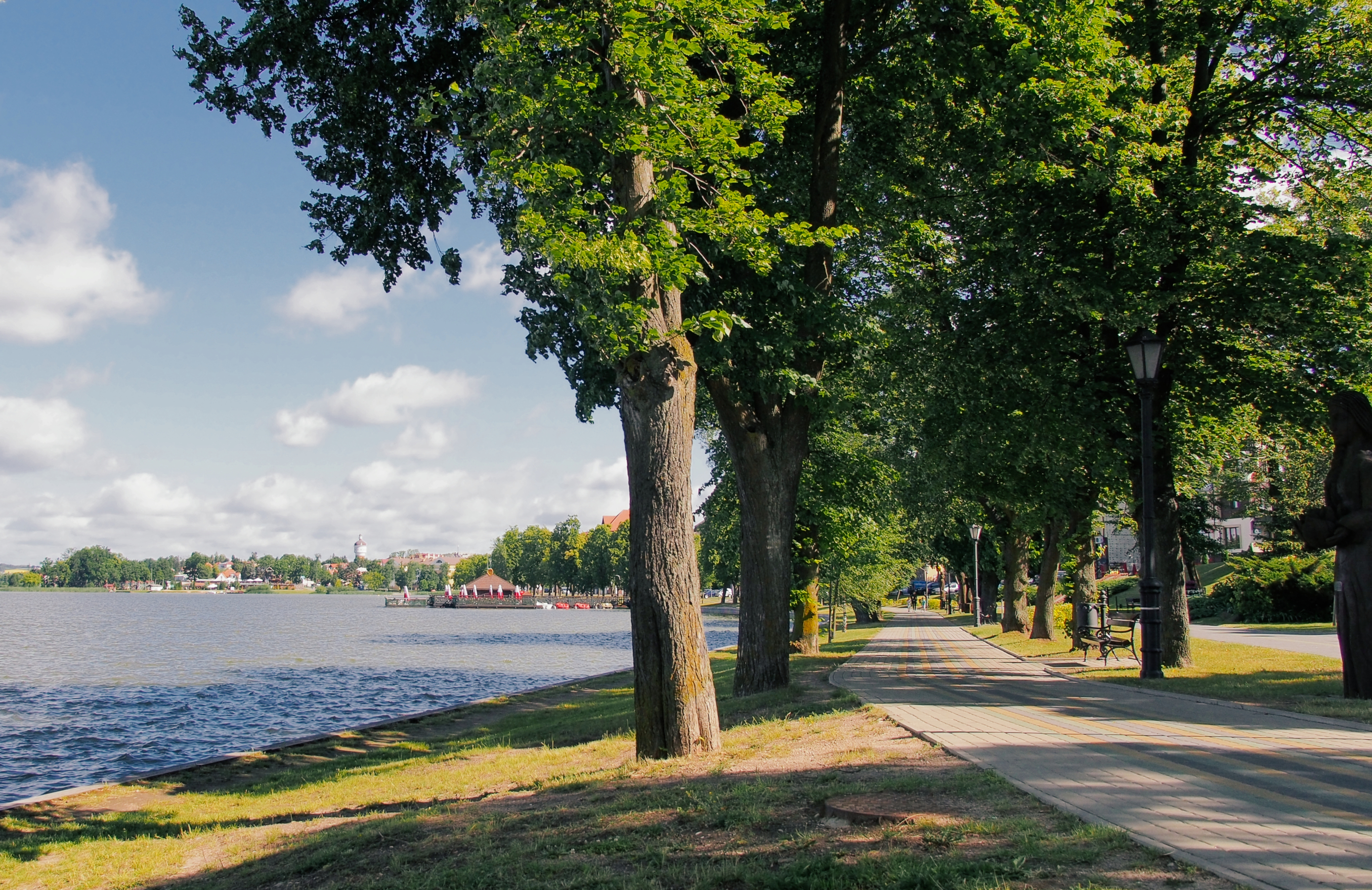
Promenade

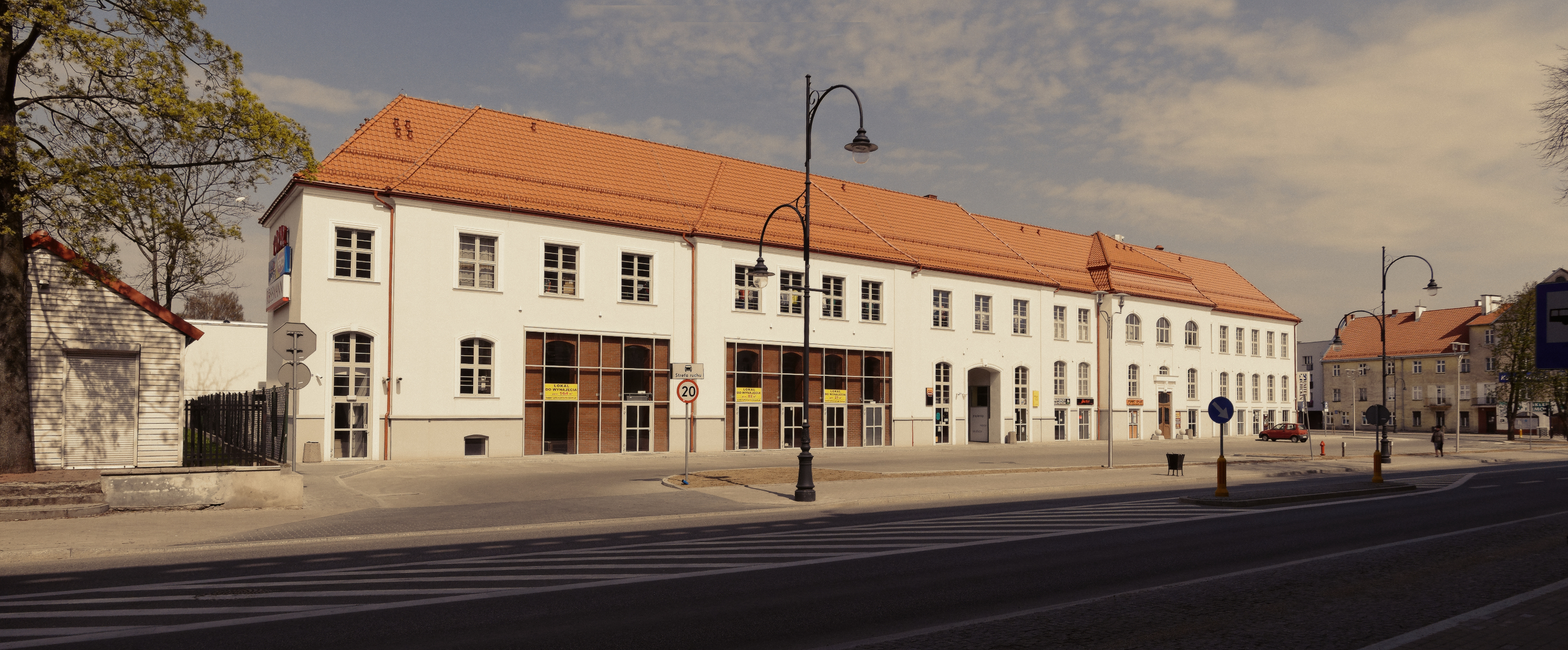
Shopping mall
