= Roman Czepe =

Polish politician (born 1956)

member of Sejm 2005-2007
- In office 25 September 2005 – ?

Personal details
- Born: 15 December 1956 (age 69)
- Party: Law and Justice

Roman Czepe (born 15 December 1956 in Ełk) is a Polish politician. He was elected to the Sejm on 25 September 2005, getting 4087 votes in 24 Białystok district as a candidate from the Law and Justice list.

== See also ==
- Members of Polish Sejm 2005-2007
