= List of mountains in Lincoln County, Montana (M-Z) =

There are at least 245 named mountains in Lincoln County, Montana.

- Marias Mountain, 48°56′32″N 115°18′55″W, el. 5,590 feet (1,700 m)
- Marmot Mountain, 48°58′31″N 115°55′28″W, el. 6,929 feet (2,112 m)
- Maxine Point, 48°44′55″N 115°28′28″W, el. 4,688 feet (1,429 m)
- McConnell Mountain, 48°25′35″N 115°54′36″W, el. 3,645 feet (1,111 m)
- McDonald Mountain, 48°10′45″N 115°36′49″W, el. 6,299 feet (1,920 m)
- McGuire Mountain, 48°41′01″N 115°12′08″W, el. 6,962 feet (2,122 m)
- McKay Mountain, 48°12′11″N 115°37′10″W, el. 5,732 feet (1,747 m)
- McMillan Mountain, 48°17′22″N 115°27′30″W, el. 4,058 feet (1,237 m)
- Midas Point, 48°05′35″N 115°31′48″W, el. 4,564 feet (1,391 m)
- Middle Mountain, 48°09′30″N 115°58′50″W, el. 6,437 feet (1,962 m)
- Mineral Mountain, 48°33′38″N 115°07′41″W, el. 5,577 feet (1,700 m)
- Mount Baldy, 48°50′04″N 115°55′32″W, el. 6,509 feet (1,984 m)
- Mount Barnaby, 48°54′52″N 114°54′14″W, el. 6,811 feet (2,076 m)
- Mount Conner, 48°19′41″N 114°51′06″W, el. 6,194 feet (1,888 m)
- Mount Gibralter, 48°52′58″N 114°51′04″W, el. 7,119 feet (2,170 m)
- Mount Henry, 48°53′00″N 115°31′07″W, el. 7,257 feet (2,212 m)
- Mount Lewis, 48°53′42″N 114°43′43″W, el. 7,326 feet (2,233 m)
- Mount Locke, 48°49′42″N 114°43′37″W, el. 7,211 feet (2,198 m)
- Mount Marston, 48°45′52″N 114°47′26″W, el. 7,342 feet (2,238 m)
- Mount Obermayer, 48°58′50″N 115°47′58″W, el. 5,315 feet (1,620 m)
- Mount Petery, 48°48′02″N 114°44′59″W, el. 7,319 feet (2,231 m)
- Mount Scotty, 48°53′01″N 114°49′28″W, el. 6,476 feet (1,974 m)
- Mount Snowy, 48°16′29″N 115°39′15″W, el. 7,615 feet (2,321 m)
- Mount Sterling, 48°17′13″N 115°14′27″W, el. 5,755 feet (1,754 m)
- Mount Tom, 48°34′35″N 115°38′25″W, el. 5,830 feet (1,780 m)
- Mount Vernon, 48°13′46″N 115°54′00″W, el. 5,574 feet (1,699 m)
- Mount Wam, 48°57′20″N 114°48′39″W, el. 7,169 feet (2,185 m)
- Murphy Mountain, 48°44′43″N 116°01′21″W, el. 6,427 feet (1,959 m)
- Mushroom Mountain, 48°57′05″N 115°51′42″W, el. 5,613 feet (1,711 m)
- Newton Mountain, 48°41′56″N 115°58′30″W, el. 6,529 feet (1,990 m)
- Norman Mountain, 48°23′27″N 115°41′40″W, el. 6,145 feet (1,873 m)
- Northwest Peak, 48°57′48″N 115°58′05″W, el. 7,700 feet (2,300 m)
- O'Brien Mountain, 48°33′04″N 115°44′35″W, el. 6,772 feet (2,064 m)
- Ojibway Peak, 48°03′45″N 115°36′54″W, el. 7,106 feet (2,166 m)
- Olsen Hill, 48°58′14″N 115°12′27″W, el. 2,828 feet (862 m)
- Owl Peak, 47°59′30″N 115°20′52″W, el. 5,072 feet (1,546 m)
- Parmenter Mountain, 48°21′25″N 115°44′05″W, el. 7,303 feet (2,226 m)
- Parsnip Mountain, 48°40′06″N 115°24′48″W, el. 6,119 feet (1,865 m)
- Pheasant Point, 48°17′59″N 115°49′18″W, el. 3,944 feet (1,202 m)
- Pink Mountain, 48°44′41″N 115°34′45″W, el. 6,565 feet (2,001 m)
- Pinkham Mountain, 48°38′35″N 115°05′31″W, el. 6,335 feet (1,931 m)
- Pinto Point, 48°44′28″N 115°27′02″W, el. 5,282 feet (1,610 m)
- Pleasant View Mountain, 48°41′49″N 115°46′44″W, el. 6,060 feet (1,850 m)
- Poker Hill, 48°11′21″N 115°27′27″W, el. 4,121 feet (1,256 m)
- Pony Mountain, 48°21′16″N 115°57′24″W, el. 5,102 feet (1,555 m)
- Poorman Mountain, 48°58′35″N 114°55′45″W, el. 7,743 feet (2,360 m)
- Preacher Mountain, 48°28′17″N 115°58′20″W, el. 4,941 feet (1,506 m)
- Prospect Hill, 48°19′45″N 115°35′07″W, el. 3,888 feet (1,185 m)
- Pulpit Mountain, 48°31′44″N 115°47′18″W, el. 6,503 feet (1,982 m)
- Purcell Summit, 48°49′46″N 115°29′41″W, el. 6,732 feet (2,052 m)
- Quartz Mountain, 48°32′33″N 115°42′02″W, el. 6,270 feet (1,910 m)
- Red Mountain, 48°54′12″N 115°21′41″W, el. 6,565 feet (2,001 m)
- Red Top Mountain, 48°45′05″N 115°58′57″W, el. 6,204 feet (1,891 m)
- Redemption Hill, 48°18′51″N 115°05′15″W, el. 4,455 feet (1,358 m)
- Richards Mountain, 48°19′48″N 115°12′59″W, el. 6,004 feet (1,830 m)
- Riverview Mountain, 48°19′37″N 115°16′16″W, el. 4,928 feet (1,502 m)
- Robinson Mountain (Lincoln County), 48°58′02″N 115°24′44″W, el. 7,539 feet (2,298 m)
- Rock Candy Mountain, 48°53′51″N 115°57′03″W, el. 7,211 feet (2,198 m)
- Roderick Butte, 48°47′28″N 115°41′56″W, el. 4,655 feet (1,419 m)
- Roderick Mountain, 48°42′19″N 115°45′28″W, el. 6,634 feet (2,022 m)
- Rogers Mountain, 48°08′11″N 115°10′45″W, el. 6,056 feet (1,846 m)
- Saddle Mountain, 48°38′44″N 115°50′07″W, el. 5,485 feet (1,672 m)
- Saint Clair Peak, 48°55′49″N 114°53′53″W, el. 7,211 feet (2,198 m)
- Samater Mountain, 48°24′39″N 115°37′37″W, el. 4,003 feet (1,220 m)
- Sand Hill, 48°57′01″N 115°11′33″W, el. 2,523 feet (769 m)
- Satire Mountain, 48°09′50″N 115°10′21″W, el. 5,650 feet (1,720 m)
- Savage Mountain, 48°14′29″N 116°01′49″W, el. 6,686 feet (2,038 m)
- Sawtooth Mountain, 48°09′50″N 115°58′40″W, el. 6,772 feet (2,064 m)
- Scalp Mountain, 48°51′26″N 115°19′41″W, el. 5,738 feet (1,749 m)
- Scenery Mountain, 48°25′00″N 115°43′00″W, el. 6,821 feet (2,079 m)
- Shaughnessy Hill, 48°19′30″N 115°37′00″W, el. 4,491 feet (1,369 m)
- Shaw Mountain, 48°06′27″N 115°35′25″W, el. 6,421 feet (1,957 m)
- Sheep Mountain, 48°32′51″N 115°07′00″W, el. 5,741 feet (1,750 m)
- Sheepherder Mountain, 48°43′54″N 115°44′09″W, el. 6,348 feet (1,935 m)
- Sheldon Mountain, 48°27′16″N 115°31′12″W, el. 4,655 feet (1,419 m)
- Sheppard Mountain, 48°21′29″N 114°54′37″W, el. 6,224 feet (1,897 m)
- Silver Butte Mountain, 47°55′09″N 115°31′22″W, el. 6,486 feet (1,977 m)
- Skillet Mountain, 48°31′59″N 114°53′11″W, el. 5,630 feet (1,720 m)
- Skookum Mountain, 48°42′55″N 115°47′27″W, el. 5,932 feet (1,808 m)
- Skyline Mountain, 48°34′43″N 115°45′58″W, el. 6,211 feet (1,893 m)
- Smoky Butte, 48°17′48″N 115°23′47″W, el. 4,370 feet (1,330 m)
- Snell Mountain, 48°10′12″N 115°14′16″W, el. 5,335 feet (1,626 m)
- Snowshoe Peak, 48°13′23″N 115°41′22″W, el. 8,707 feet (2,654 m)
- South Fork Hill, 48°40′43″N 115°29′30″W, el. 5,381 feet (1,640 m)
- Spar Peak, 48°13′26″N 115°59′13″W, el. 6,552 feet (1,997 m)
- Spruce Mountain, 48°18′57″N 115°58′57″W, el. 5,755 feet (1,754 m)
- Stahl Peak, 48°55′17″N 114°50′47″W, el. 7,392 feet (2,253 m)
- Stanley Mountain, 48°15′43″N 115°52′53″W, el. 4,268 feet (1,301 m)
- Stanley Peak, 48°17′22″N 115°58′30″W, el. 5,800 feet (1,800 m)
- Stenerson Mountain, 48°34′11″N 115°09′23″W, el. 5,817 feet (1,773 m)
- Stryker Peak, 48°41′05″N 114°41′32″W, el. 7,329 feet (2,234 m)
- Sugarloaf Mountain, 48°19′51″N 115°43′53″W, el. 7,490 feet (2,280 m)
- Sugarloaf Mountain, 48°21′41″N 115°07′04″W, el. 5,413 feet (1,650 m)
- Surprise Hill, 48°15′20″N 114°59′57″W, el. 4,537 feet (1,383 m)
- Survey Mountain, 48°22′06″N 116°01′54″W, el. 6,401 feet (1,951 m)
- Sutton Mountain, 48°40′32″N 115°09′35″W, el. 6,824 feet (2,080 m)
- Swamp Mountain, 48°35′03″N 114°59′52″W, el. 4,961 feet (1,512 m)
- Swede Mountain, 48°22′05″N 115°27′37″W, el. 4,295 feet (1,309 m)
- Tangen Mountain, 48°15′20″N 115°25′57″W, el. 5,026 feet (1,532 m)
- Taylor Peak, 48°23′14″N 115°47′23″W, el. 6,289 feet (1,917 m)
- Teeters Peak, 48°04′08″N 115°28′12″W, el. 5,167 feet (1,575 m)
- Tenmile Mountain, 48°38′16″N 115°07′19″W, el. 6,092 feet (1,857 m)
- Tepee Mountain, 48°20′44″N 114°55′27″W, el. 5,843 feet (1,781 m)
- Tepee Mountain, 48°39′24″N 115°56′50″W, el. 5,745 feet (1,751 m)
- Thirsty Mountain, 48°49′11″N 115°23′18″W, el. 6,256 feet (1,907 m)
- Thunder Mountain, 48°48′30″N 116°00′03″W, el. 6,024 feet (1,836 m)
- Tony Peak, 48°20′52″N 115°21′16″W, el. 4,813 feet (1,467 m)
- Treasure Mountain, 48°18′58″N 115°40′23″W, el. 7,671 feet (2,338 m)
- Turner Mountain, 48°36′36″N 115°39′03″W, el. 5,932 feet (1,808 m)
- Twin Peaks, 48°04′00″N 115°35′49″W, el. 7,408 feet (2,258 m)
- Vermiculite Mountain, 48°26′08″N 115°24′01″W, el. 4,249 feet (1,295 m)
- Virginia Hill, 48°47′24″N 115°06′31″W, el. 4,531 feet (1,381 m)
- Wapiti Mountain, 48°03′21″N 115°15′26″W, el. 4,728 feet (1,441 m)
- Warland Peak, 48°29′04″N 115°06′24″W, el. 5,951 feet (1,814 m)
- Webb Mountain, 48°49′05″N 115°20′38″W, el. 5,987 feet (1,825 m)
- Weigel Mountain, 48°25′38″N 115°02′33″W, el. 5,768 feet (1,758 m)
- Weir Peak, 48°20′24″N 115°43′14″W, el. 7,254 feet (2,211 m)
- William Grambauer Mountain, 48°24′40″N 115°45′14″W, el. 6,772 feet (2,064 m)
- Wolf Mountain, 48°14′01″N 115°09′06″W, el. 6,096 feet (1,858 m)
- Wolf Point, 48°24′58″N 115°00′21″W, el. 5,528 feet (1,685 m)
- Wood Mountain, 48°59′06″N 115°34′05″W, el. 5,873 feet (1,790 m)
- Yaak Mountain, 48°33′37″N 115°55′15″W, el. 4,951 feet (1,509 m)
- Ziegler Mountain, 48°34′38″N 115°15′48″W, el. 5,403 feet (1,647 m)
- Zimmerman Hill, 48°55′30″N 115°37′15″W, el. 5,046 feet (1,538 m)

== See also ==
- List of mountains in Montana
- List of mountain ranges in Montana
