= Ibex Peak (Montana) =

Mountain in Montana, United States

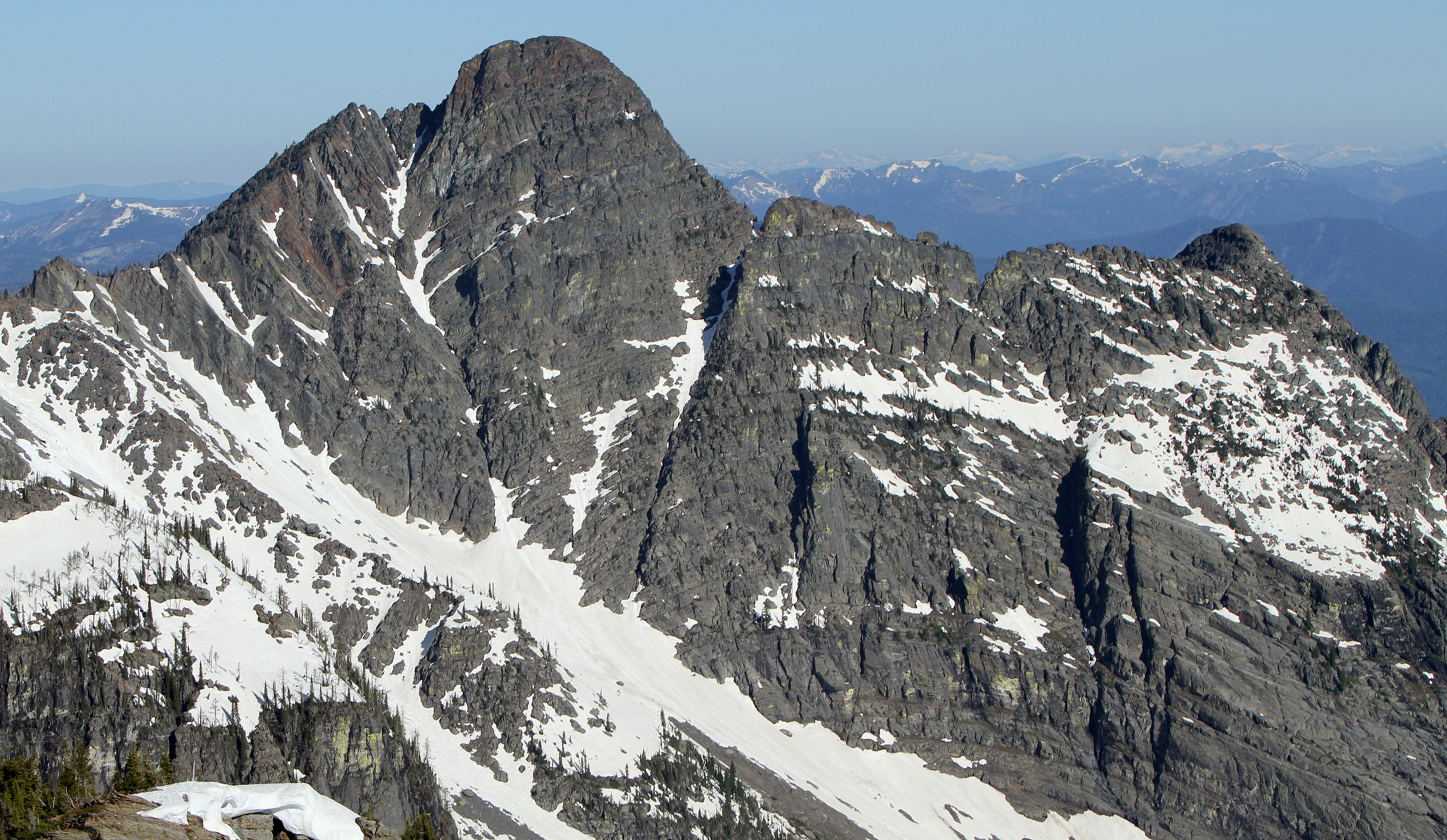
- Southeast aspect

Highest point
- Elevation: 7,676 ft (2,340 m)
- Prominence: 576 ft (176 m)
- Parent peak: Snowshoe Peak (8,738 ft)
- Isolation: 2.68 mi (4.31 km)
- Coordinates: 48°11′50″N 115°45′05″W

Naming
- Etymology: Ibex

Geography
- Location within Montana Location within the United States
- Country: United States
- State: Montana
- County: Sanders
- Protected area: Cabinet Mountains Wilderness
- Parent range: Cabinet Mountains
- Topo map: USGS Ibex Peak

Ibex Peak is a 7,676-foot-elevation (2,340-meter) mountain summit in Sanders County, Montana.

== Description ==
Ibex Peak is located 15 miles (24 km) southwest of Libby, Montana, in the Cabinet Mountains Wilderness, on land managed by Kaniksu National Forest. It is set west of the Continental Divide in the Cabinet Mountains which are a subrange of the Rocky Mountains. Ibex Peak ranks as the eighth-highest summit in the Cabinet Mountains, and the ninth-highest in Sanders County. Precipitation runoff from the mountain drains into tributaries of the Bull River, which in turn is a tributary of the Clark Fork River. Topographic relief is significant as the summit rises 4,600 feet (1,400 m) above Middle Fork Bull River in 1.25 mile (2 km). The mountain's toponym has been officially adopted by the U.S. Board on Geographic Names.

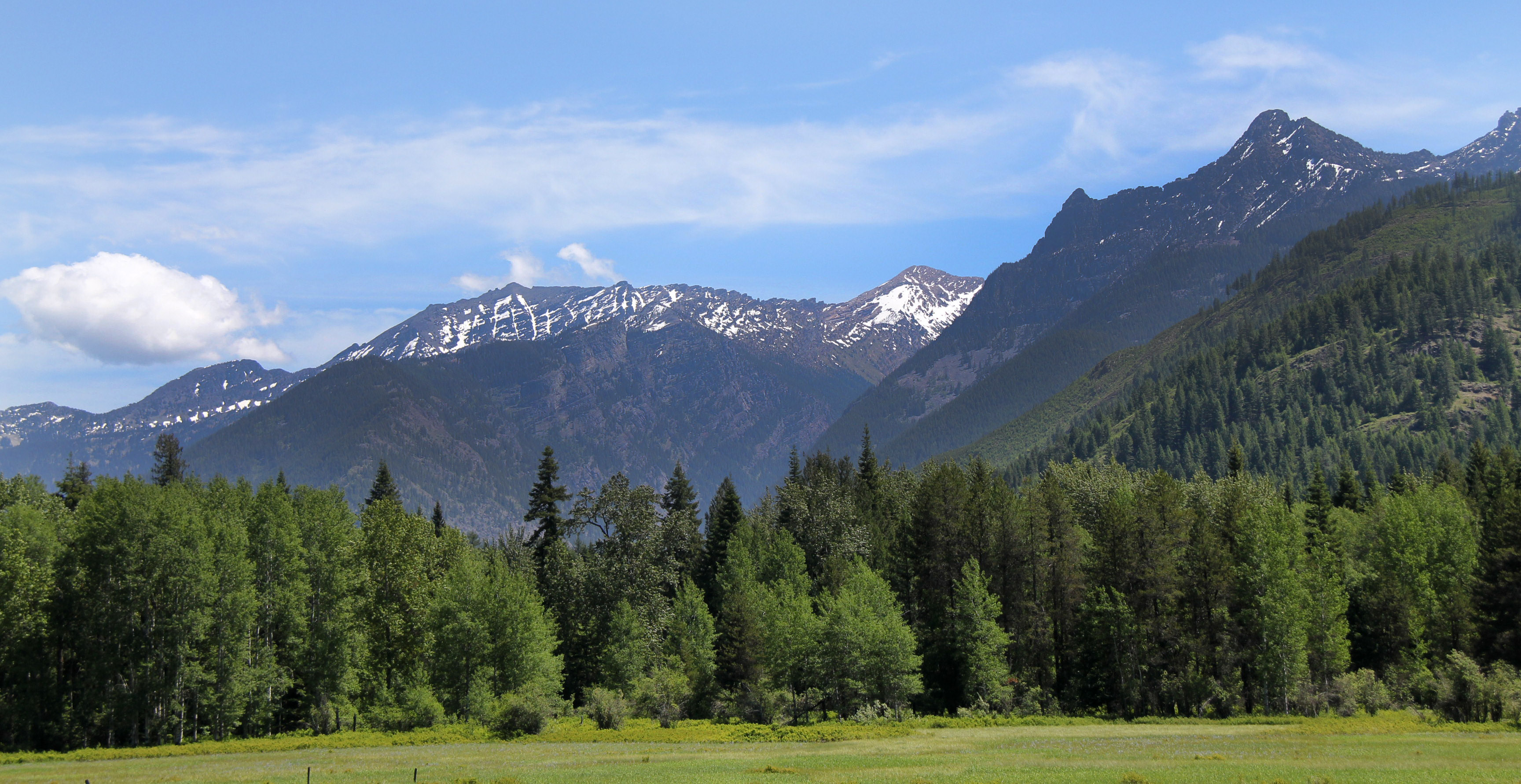
West aspect of Ibex Peak (upper right) viewed from Bull River Valley. (A Peak and Snowshoe Peak centered in the distance)

== Climate ==
Based on the Köppen climate classification, Ibex Peak is located in a subarctic climate zone characterized by long, usually very cold winters, and cool to mild summers. Winter temperatures can drop below −10 °F with wind chill factors below −30 °F.

== See also ==
- Geology of the Rocky Mountains
