= Swede =

Swede or Swedes may refer to:

== People ==
- Swede, a resident or citizen of Sweden
- Swedes, a Germanic ethnic group
- Swedes (tribe), an ancient North Germanic tribe inhabiting parts of modern-day Sweden and Finland

=== Individuals ===
- Swede (nickname), a list of people
- George Swede (born 1940), Canadian psychologist, poet and children's writer
- Puma Swede (born 1976), Swedish porn star
- Swede Hanson (wrestler) (1933–2002), ring name of American professional wrestler Robert Fort Hanson

== Characters ==
- Seymour "Swede" Levov, protagonist in the Philip Roth novel American Pastoral
- "The Swede", a Norwegian on the AMC TV show Hell on Wheels

== Other uses ==
- Swede, a root vegetable, called rutabaga in North America
- Swede Lake, Minnesota, United States
- Swede Mountain, New York, United States

== See also ==
- Suede (disambiguation)
- Sweden (disambiguation)
