= List of mountains in Lincoln County, Montana (A-L) =

There are at least 245 named mountains in Lincoln County, Montana.

- A Peak, 48°14′19″N 115°41′57″W, el. 8,612 feet (2,625 m)
- Abe Lincoln Mountain, 48°40′53″N 115°53′53″W, el. 4,892 feet (1,491 m)
- Alaska Peak, 48°10′15″N 115°39′44″W, el. 6,985 feet (2,129 m)
- Alexander Mountain, 48°26′26″N 115°21′14″W, el. 4,636 feet (1,413 m)
- Allen Peak, 47°56′29″N 115°23′59″W, el. 6,735 feet (2,053 m)
- American Mountain, 48°57′42″N 116°02′01″W, el. 6,581 feet (2,006 m)
- Ant Hill, 48°31′17″N 115°14′12″W, el. 3,822 feet (1,165 m)
- Arbo Mountain, 48°37′32″N 115°47′22″W, el. 6,178 feet (1,883 m)
- Banfield Mountain, 48°33′28″N 115°27′00″W, el. 6,112 feet (1,863 m)
- Baree Mountain, 47°57′32″N 115°31′47″W, el. 6,053 feet (1,845 m)
- Barren Peak, 48°01′33″N 115°24′50″W, el. 5,331 feet (1,625 m)
- Beartrap Mountain, 48°47′00″N 115°14′48″W, el. 5,613 feet (1,711 m)
- Beetle Hill, 48°48′27″N 115°36′56″W, el. 4,892 feet (1,491 m)
- Big Creek Baldy Mountain, 48°38′08″N 115°32′42″W, el. 5,715 feet (1,742 m)
- Big Hoodoo Mountain, 48°13′20″N 115°32′32″W, el. 5,207 feet (1,587 m)
- Big Loaf Mountain, 48°14′41″N 115°38′56″W, el. 7,582 feet (2,311 m)
- Black Butte, 48°51′53″N 115°07′30″W, el. 4,032 feet (1,229 m)
- Black Top, 48°55′41″N 115°53′28″W, el. 6,486 feet (1,977 m)
- Blue Mountain, 48°29′56″N 115°27′11″W, el. 6,030 feet (1,840 m)
- Bockman Peak, 48°14′13″N 115°40′02″W, el. 8,169 feet (2,490 m)
- Boulder Mountain, 48°49′36″N 115°27′15″W, el. 7,047 feet (2,148 m)
- Boundary Mountain, 48°26′01″N 115°08′19″W, el. 5,948 feet (1,813 m)
- Bowers Peak, 48°01′16″N 115°04′29″W, el. 4,383 feet (1,336 m)
- Brush Mountain, 48°13′26″N 115°23′08″W, el. 5,846 feet (1,782 m)
- Bunker Hill, 48°48′18″N 115°30′19″W, el. 6,493 feet (1,979 m)
- Burnt Peak, 48°21′18″N 116°00′25″W, el. 6,293 feet (1,918 m)
- Cable Mountain, 48°08′21″N 115°37′15″W, el. 6,798 feet (2,072 m)
- Calx Mountain, 48°12′11″N 115°08′10″W, el. 6,539 feet (1,993 m)
- Canuck Peak, 48°56′02″N 116°01′18″W, el. 6,936 feet (2,114 m)
- Caribou Mountain, 48°59′35″N 115°30′49″W, el. 6,840 feet (2,080 m)
- Carney Peak, 48°01′15″N 115°34′05″W, el. 6,860 feet (2,090 m)
- Chief Peak, 48°39′20″N 115°42′18″W, el. 5,039 feet (1,536 m)
- China Mountain, 48°30′03″N 115°45′00″W, el. 6,309 feet (1,923 m)
- Clark Mountain, 48°46′27″N 115°51′05″W, el. 6,414 feet (1,955 m)
- Clay Mountain, 48°44′01″N 115°40′21″W, el. 4,990 feet (1,520 m)
- Cliff Point, 48°45′25″N 115°19′28″W, el. 4,524 feet (1,379 m)
- Clingback Mountain, 48°54′05″N 115°19′18″W, el. 6,332 feet (1,930 m)
- Conn Mountain, 48°38′16″N 115°48′34″W, el. 5,463 feet (1,665 m)
- Cooney Peak, 48°59′47″N 115°54′54″W, el. 6,647 feet (2,026 m)
- Copper Mountain, 48°23′04″N 115°53′24″W, el. 3,379 feet (1,030 m)
- Cripple Horse Mountain, 48°26′02″N 115°10′32″W, el. 5,400 feet (1,600 m)
- Cross Mountain, 48°43′28″N 116°00′20″W, el. 6,539 feet (1,993 m)
- Cross Mountain, 48°43′17″N 116°00′00″W, el. 6,375 feet (1,943 m)
- Crowell Mountain, 48°16′14″N 115°45′54″W, el. 6,883 feet (2,098 m)
- Davis Mountain, 48°30′20″N 115°00′54″W, el. 6,050 feet (1,840 m)
- Davis Mountain, 48°56′18″N 115°58′05″W, el. 7,575 feet (2,309 m)
- Davis Peak, 47°58′34″N 115°10′46″W, el. 5,335 feet (1,626 m)
- Deep Mountain, 48°48′35″N 114°47′47″W, el. 7,405 feet (2,257 m)
- Dome Mountain, 48°21′43″N 115°45′08″W, el. 7,513 feet (2,290 m)
- Dooley Mountain, 48°41′55″N 115°49′55″W, el. 4,642 feet (1,415 m)
- Doonan Peak, 48°17′41″N 115°46′43″W, el. 6,795 feet (2,071 m)
- Drift Peak, 48°17′35″N 116°01′42″W, el. 6,266 feet (1,910 m)
- Dunn Peak, 48°20′12″N 115°13′33″W, el. 5,751 feet (1,753 m)
- Dusty Peak, 48°59′26″N 115°43′57″W, el. 5,682 feet (1,732 m)
- East Fork Peak, 48°15′00″N 116°02′46″W, el. 5,715 feet (1,742 m)
- Edna Mountain, 48°41′29″N 114°58′03″W, el. 4,606 feet (1,404 m)
- Elephant Peak, 48°05′18″N 115°37′55″W, el. 7,937 feet (2,419 m)
- Elk Mountain, 48°27′21″N 114°54′50″W, el. 6,519 feet (1,987 m)
- Ellsworth Mountain, 48°37′05″N 115°12′12″W, el. 5,892 feet (1,796 m)
- Eureka Hill, 48°51′17″N 115°03′07″W, el. 3,173 feet (967 m)
- Feeder Mountain, 48°36′22″N 115°49′08″W, el. 6,092 feet (1,857 m)
- Fisher Mountain, 48°13′39″N 115°21′00″W, el. 5,430 feet (1,660 m)
- Flagstaff Mountain, 48°28′53″N 115°42′45″W, el. 6,060 feet (1,850 m)
- Flatiron Mountain, 48°40′31″N 115°39′56″W, el. 5,787 feet (1,764 m)
- Fleetwood Point, 48°26′51″N 115°22′25″W, el. 4,816 feet (1,468 m)
- Flower Point, 48°21′41″N 115°37′44″W, el. 4,278 feet (1,304 m)
- Fosseum Mountain, 48°00′55″N 115°17′37″W, el. 4,587 feet (1,398 m)
- Friday Hill, 48°42′52″N 115°55′00″W, el. 5,568 feet (1,697 m)
- Fritz Mountain, 48°06′23″N 115°15′24″W, el. 5,777 feet (1,761 m)
- Garden Ridge, 48°38′18″N 115°27′25″W, el. 5,896 feet (1,797 m)
- Garver Mountain, 48°55′45″N 115°47′41″W, el. 5,856 feet (1,785 m)
- Goat Mountain, 48°24′24″N 115°58′26″W, el. 5,413 feet (1,650 m)
- Gold Hill, 48°35′04″N 115°30′58″W, el. 5,538 feet (1,688 m)
- Gopher Hill, 48°26′55″N 115°16′43″W, el. 3,563 feet (1,086 m)
- Gordon Mountain, 48°17′45″N 115°45′04″W, el. 7,333 feet (2,235 m)
- Grambauer Mountain, 48°24′11″N 115°44′45″W, el. 7,365 feet (2,245 m)
- Great Northern Mountain, 48°05′03″N 115°33′59″W, el. 6,840 feet (2,080 m)
- Green Mountain, 48°57′40″N 114°56′03″W, el. 7,821 feet (2,384 m)
- Grizzly Point, 48°46′10″N 115°47′08″W, el. 6,086 feet (1,855 m)
- Grouse Mountain, 48°23′02″N 115°56′15″W, el. 4,984 feet (1,519 m)
- Grubstake Mountain, 48°58′23″N 115°33′44″W, el. 5,761 feet (1,756 m)
- Gunsight Mountain, 48°36′34″N 115°50′55″W, el. 6,056 feet (1,846 m)
- Gus Brink Mountain, 48°16′32″N 115°44′10″W, el. 7,050 feet (2,150 m)
- Haystack Mountain, 48°41′49″N 116°02′12″W, el. 3,694 feet (1,126 m)
- Helmer Mountain, 48°46′06″N 115°11′09″W, el. 5,417 feet (1,651 m)
- Hensley Hill, 48°51′43″N 115°43′21″W, el. 4,967 feet (1,514 m)
- Herrig Mountain, 48°43′08″N 114°41′03″W, el. 7,274 feet (2,217 m)
- Horse Hill, 48°19′55″N 114°58′37″W, el. 4,974 feet (1,516 m)
- Horse Mountain, 48°08′23″N 115°28′50″W, el. 5,774 feet (1,760 m)
- Houser Peak, 48°15′56″N 115°41′45″W, el. 6,417 feet (1,956 m)
- Huckleberry Mountain, 48°36′43″N 115°08′13″W, el. 6,053 feet (1,845 m)
- Huson Peak, 48°33′16″N 115°43′13″W, el. 6,129 feet (1,868 m)
- Inch Mountain, 48°43′04″N 115°15′41″W, el. 6,207 feet (1,892 m)
- Independence Mountain, 48°43′07″N 115°49′39″W, el. 4,882 feet (1,488 m)
- Independence Peak, 48°57′33″N 114°58′01″W, el. 7,241 feet (2,207 m)
- Indian Head, 48°21′07″N 115°41′29″W, el. 7,244 feet (2,208 m)
- Indian Peak, 48°39′19″N 115°43′36″W, el. 4,997 feet (1,523 m)
- Jumbo Peak, 47°59′12″N 115°22′16″W, el. 5,377 feet (1,639 m)
- Keeler Mountain, 48°19′14″N 115°53′40″W, el. 4,947 feet (1,508 m)
- Kenelty Mountain, 48°05′14″N 115°18′48″W, el. 5,928 feet (1,807 m)
- Kenelty Mountain, 48°05′13″N 115°18′48″W, el. 5,938 feet (1,810 m)
- Keno Mountain, 48°50′16″N 116°02′12″W, el. 6,539 feet (1,993 m)
- Keystone Mountain, 48°42′31″N 115°56′01″W, el. 5,653 feet (1,723 m)
- King Mountain, 48°29′14″N 115°47′38″W, el. 5,771 feet (1,759 m)
- Kootenai Mountain, 48°28′13″N 115°47′51″W, el. 5,298 feet (1,615 m)
- Krag Peak, 48°49′44″N 114°46′57″W, el. 7,461 feet (2,274 m)
- Krinklehorn Peak, 48°49′10″N 114°47′11″W, el. 7,385 feet (2,251 m)
- Ksanka Peak, 48°56′04″N 114°56′28″W, el. 7,497 feet (2,285 m)
- Lawrence Mountain, 48°37′33″N 115°24′33″W, el. 6,168 feet (1,880 m)
- Lick Mountain, 48°58′43″N 115°38′46″W, el. 4,816 feet (1,468 m)
- Lightning Peak, 48°13′36″N 115°15′16″W, el. 4,124 feet (1,257 m)
- Lime Butte, 48°21′37″N 115°52′40″W, el. 2,615 feet (797 m)
- Lindy Peak, 48°28′21″N 115°37′09″W, el. 4,331 feet (1,320 m)
- Little Hoodoo Mountain, 48°15′28″N 115°33′51″W, el. 4,160 feet (1,270 m)
- Little Sutton Mountain, 48°40′14″N 115°10′34″W, el. 6,647 feet (2,026 m)
- Little Tom Mountain, 48°34′54″N 115°40′50″W, el. 5,771 feet (1,759 m)
- Loon Peak, 48°35′37″N 115°43′24″W, el. 5,607 feet (1,709 m)
- Lost Horse Mountain, 48°02′30″N 115°36′01″W, el. 7,461 feet (2,274 m)
- Lost Horse Mountain, 48°47′33″N 115°34′01″W, el. 6,539 feet (1,993 m)
- Lost Soul Mountain, 48°34′56″N 115°25′55″W, el. 6,155 feet (1,876 m)
- Lucky Point, 48°46′45″N 115°53′08″W, el. 5,177 feet (1,578 m)
- Lydia Mountain, 48°41′55″N 115°08′31″W, el. 6,667 feet (2,032 m)

== See also ==
- List of mountains in Montana
- List of mountain ranges in Montana
