= Rock Peak =

Mountain summit in Sanders County, Montana

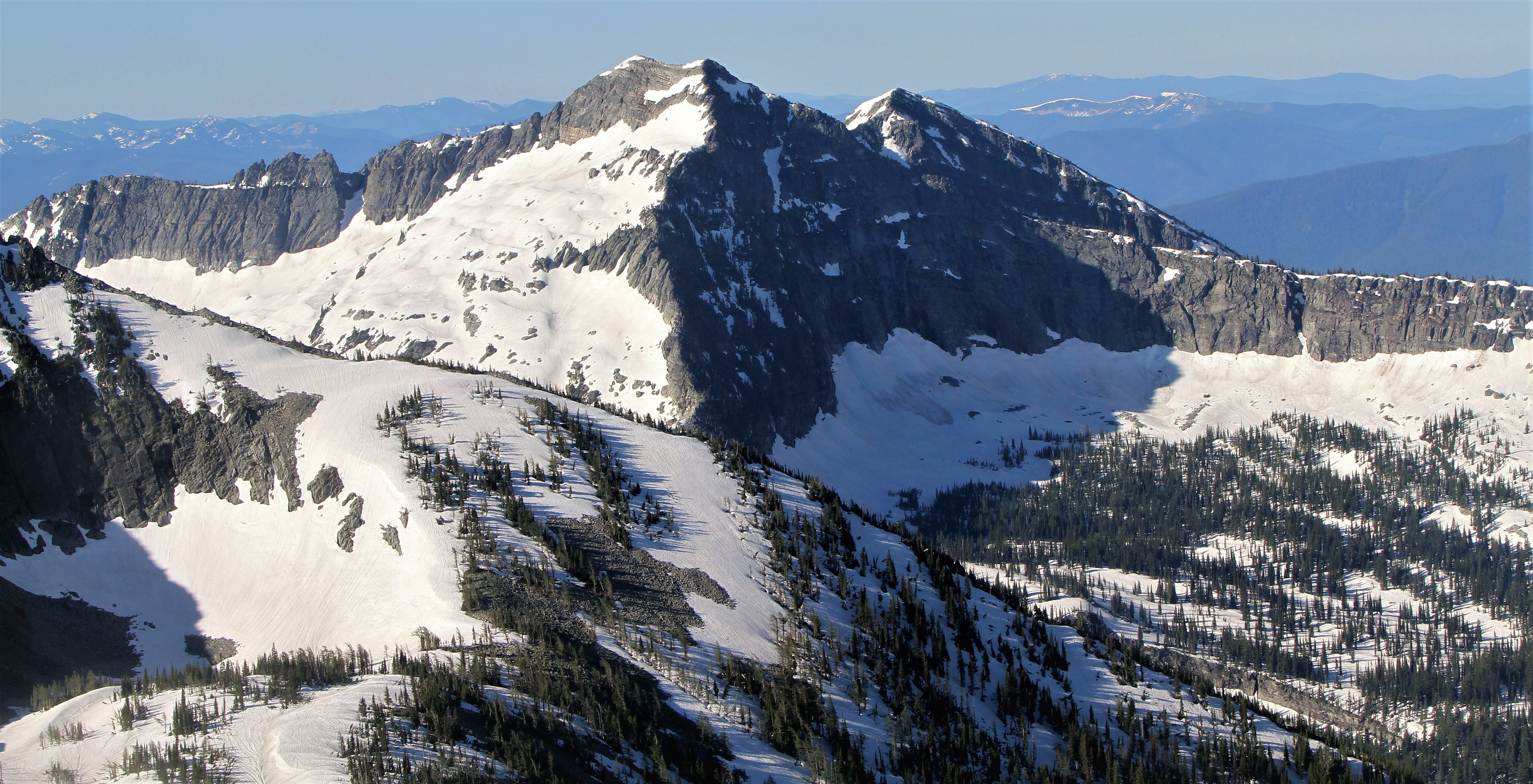
- North aspect

Highest point
- Elevation: 7,583 ft (2,311 m)
- Prominence: 993 ft (303 m)
- Parent peak: Saint Paul Peak (7,714 ft)
- Isolation: 1.25 mi (2.01 km)
- Coordinates: 48°04′04″N 115°39′19″W

Geography
- Location within Montana Location within the United States
- Country: United States
- State: Montana
- County: Sanders
- Protected area: Cabinet Mountains Wilderness
- Parent range: Cabinet Mountains
- Topo map: USGS Elephant Peak

Rock Peak is a 7,583-foot-elevation (2,311-meter) mountain summit in Sanders County, Montana.

== Description ==
Rock Peak is located 22 miles (35 km) south of Libby, Montana, in the Cabinet Mountains Wilderness, on land managed by Kaniksu National Forest. It is set west of the Continental Divide in the Cabinet Mountains which are a subrange of the Rocky Mountains. Precipitation runoff from the mountain's south slopes drains into Rock Creek, whereas the north slope drains into headwaters of East Fork Bull River, and both are tributaries of the Clark Fork River. Topographic relief is significant as the summit rises 4,100 feet (1,200 m) above Rock Creek in 1.7 mile (2.7 km). The mountain's toponym has been officially adopted by the U.S. Board on Geographic Names.

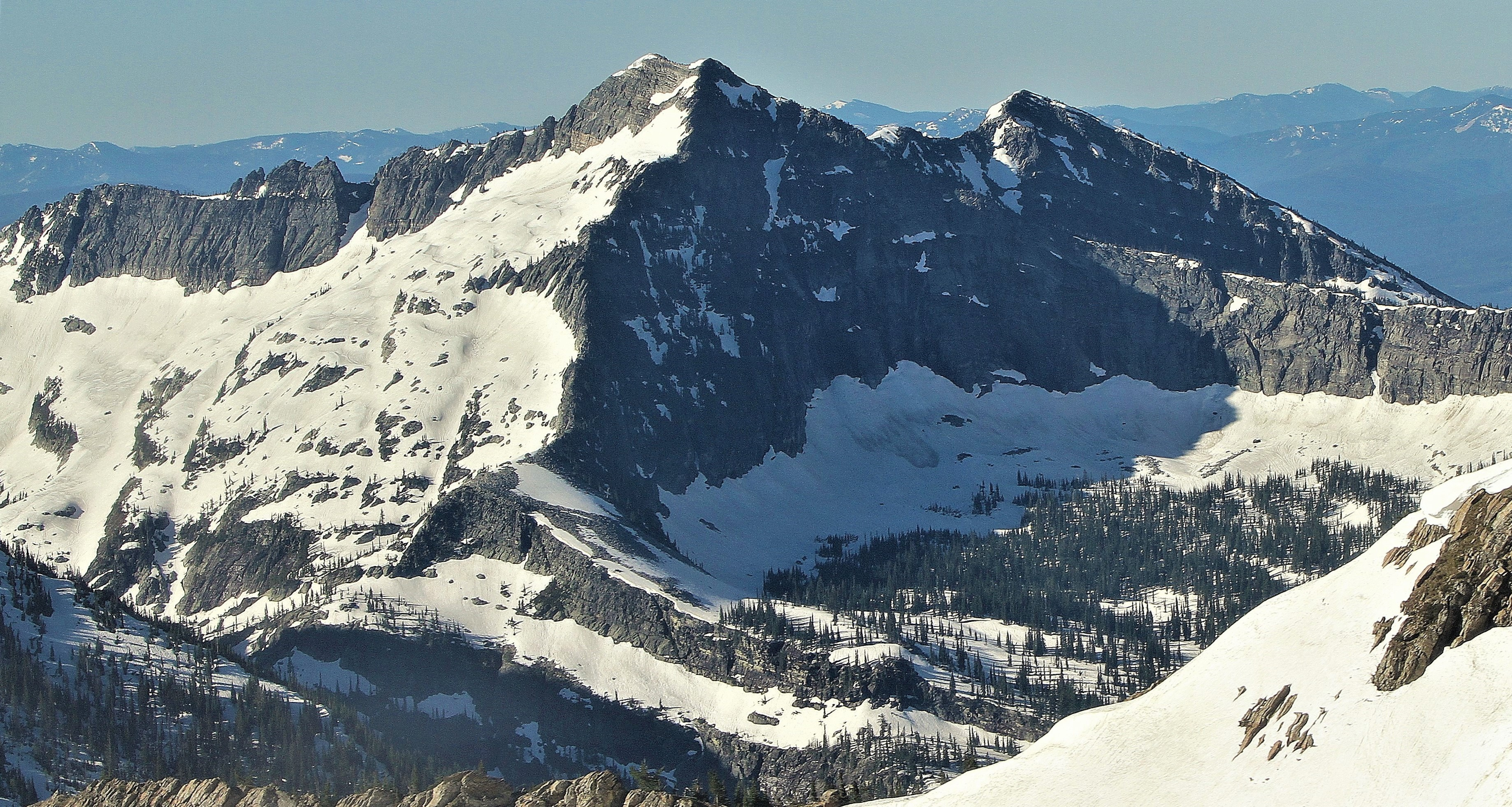
North aspect of Rock Peak

== Climate ==
Based on the Köppen climate classification, Rock Peak is located in a subarctic climate zone characterized by long, usually very cold winters, and cool to mild summers. Winter temperatures can drop below −10 °F with wind chill factors below −30 °F.

== See also ==
- Geology of the Rocky Mountains
