= Engle Peak =

Mountain in Montana, United States

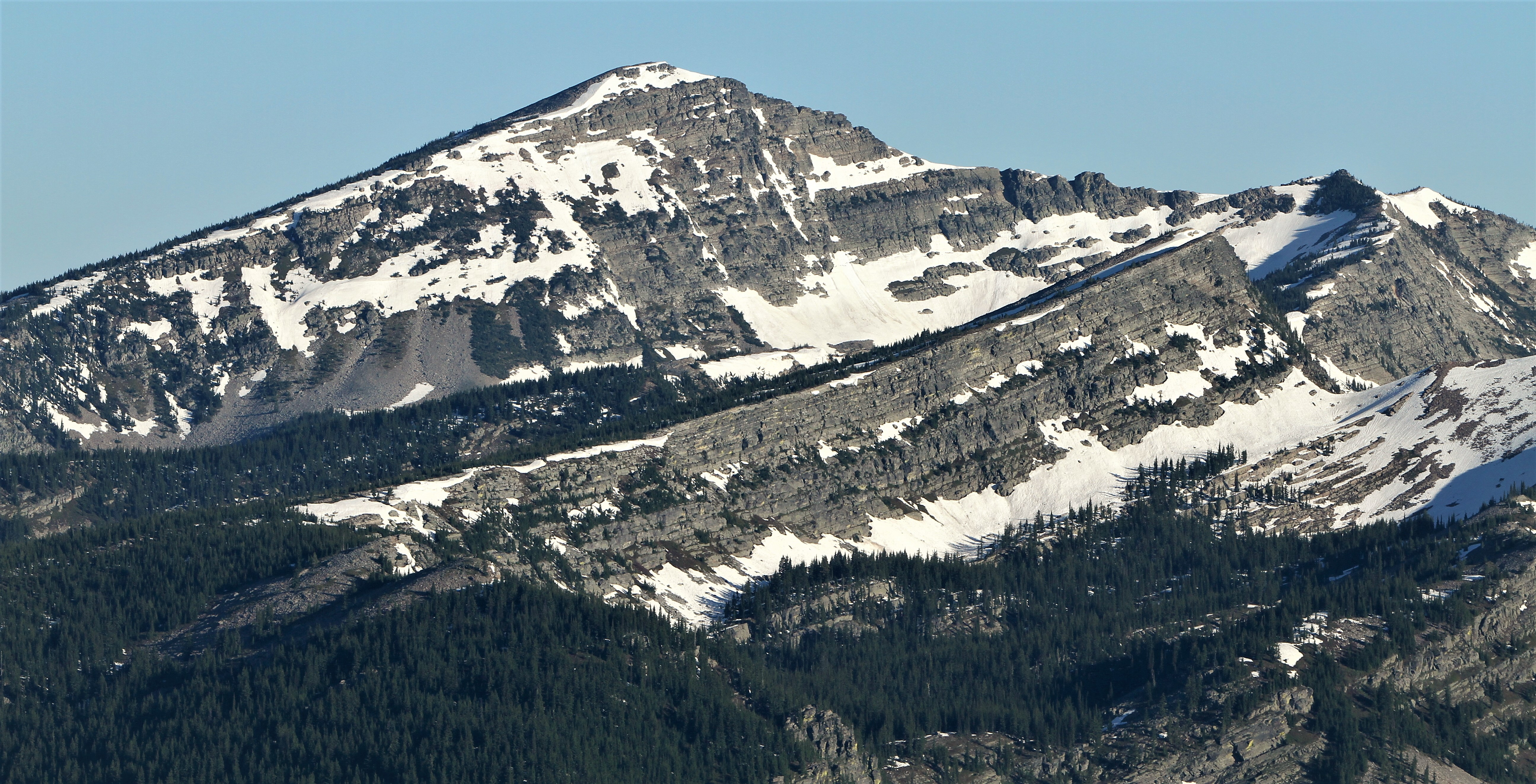
- Southeast aspect

Highest point
- Elevation: 7,583 ft (2,311 m)
- Prominence: 803 ft (245 m)
- Parent peak: Flat Top Mountain (7,608 ft)
- Isolation: 1.73 mi (2.78 km)
- Coordinates: 48°00′33″N 115°37′11″W

Geography
- Location within Montana Location within the United States
- Country: United States
- State: Montana
- County: Sanders
- Protected area: Cabinet Mountains Wilderness
- Parent range: Cabinet Mountains
- Topo map: USGS Howard Lake

Climbing
- Easiest route: class 2 trail

Engle Peak is a 7,583-foot-elevation (2,311-meter) mountain summit in Sanders County, Montana.

== Description ==
Engle Peak is located 7 miles (11 km) east of Noxon, Montana, along the boundary of the Cabinet Mountains Wilderness, on land managed by Kaniksu National Forest. It is set west of the Continental Divide in the Cabinet Mountains which are a subrange of the Rocky Mountains. Precipitation runoff from the mountain's south slopes drains to McKay Creek, whereas the north slope drains into Engle Lake and Rock Creek, and both creeks are tributaries of the Clark Fork River. Topographic relief is significant as the summit rises 1,500 feet (460 m) above Engle Lake in one-half mile (0.8 km). Engle Lake is named after pioneer Isaac Engle (1855–1928) who homesteaded nearby. Engle Peak is named after Roy Engle of Noxon who saved the lives of 25 crewmembers fighting a 1910 forest fire. The mountain's toponym has been officially adopted by the U.S. Board on Geographic Names, and has appeared in publications since 1875. An ascent of the summit involves hiking 3.9 miles with 3,489-feet of elevation gain on the Engle Peak Trail.

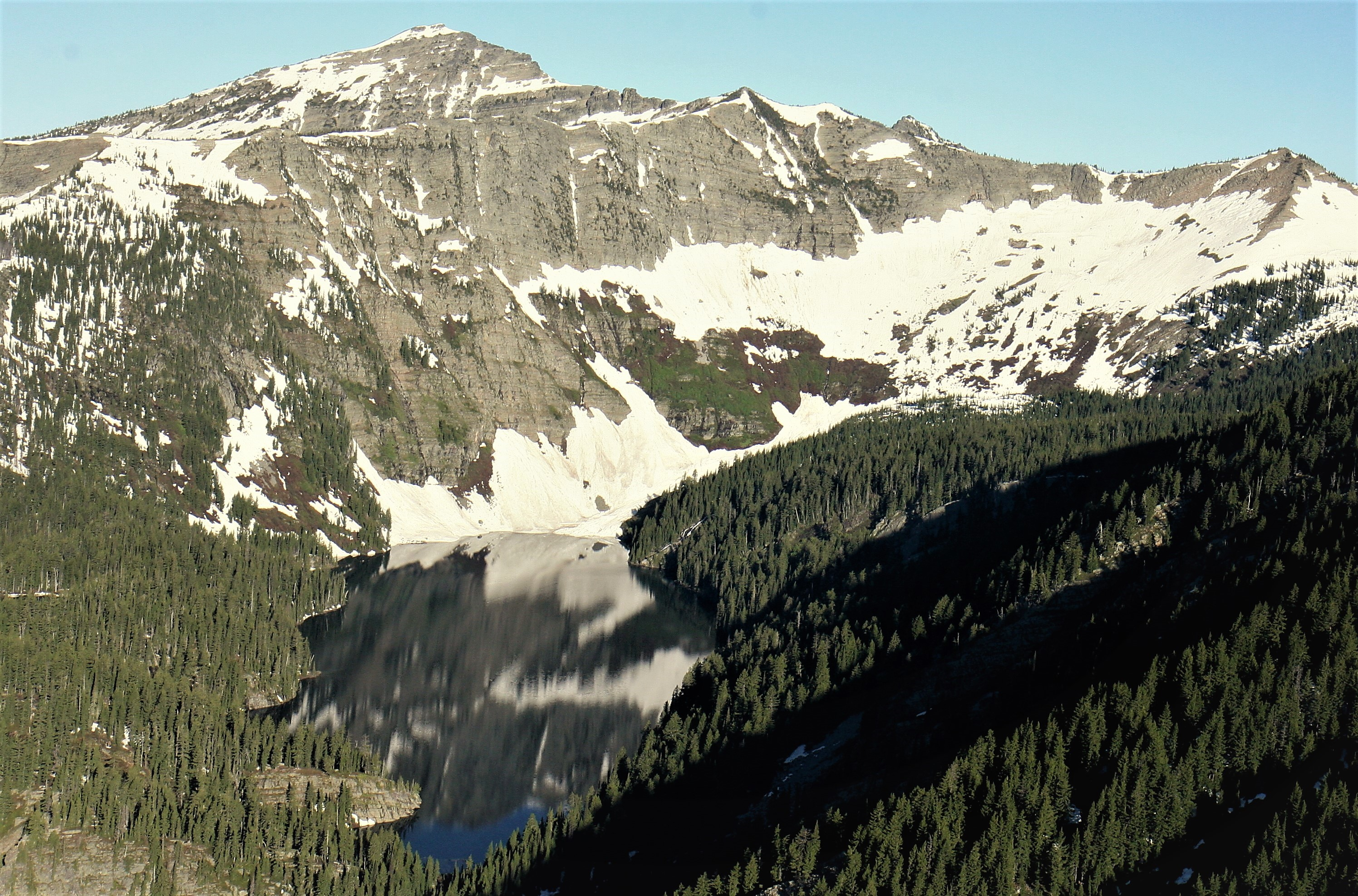
East aspect of Engle Peak with Wanless Lake

== Climate ==
Based on the Köppen climate classification, Engle Peak is located in a subarctic climate zone characterized by long, usually very cold winters, and cool to mild summers. Winter temperatures can drop below −10 °F with wind chill factors below −30 °F.

== See also ==
- Geology of the Rocky Mountains
