= A Peak =

Mountain in Montana, United States

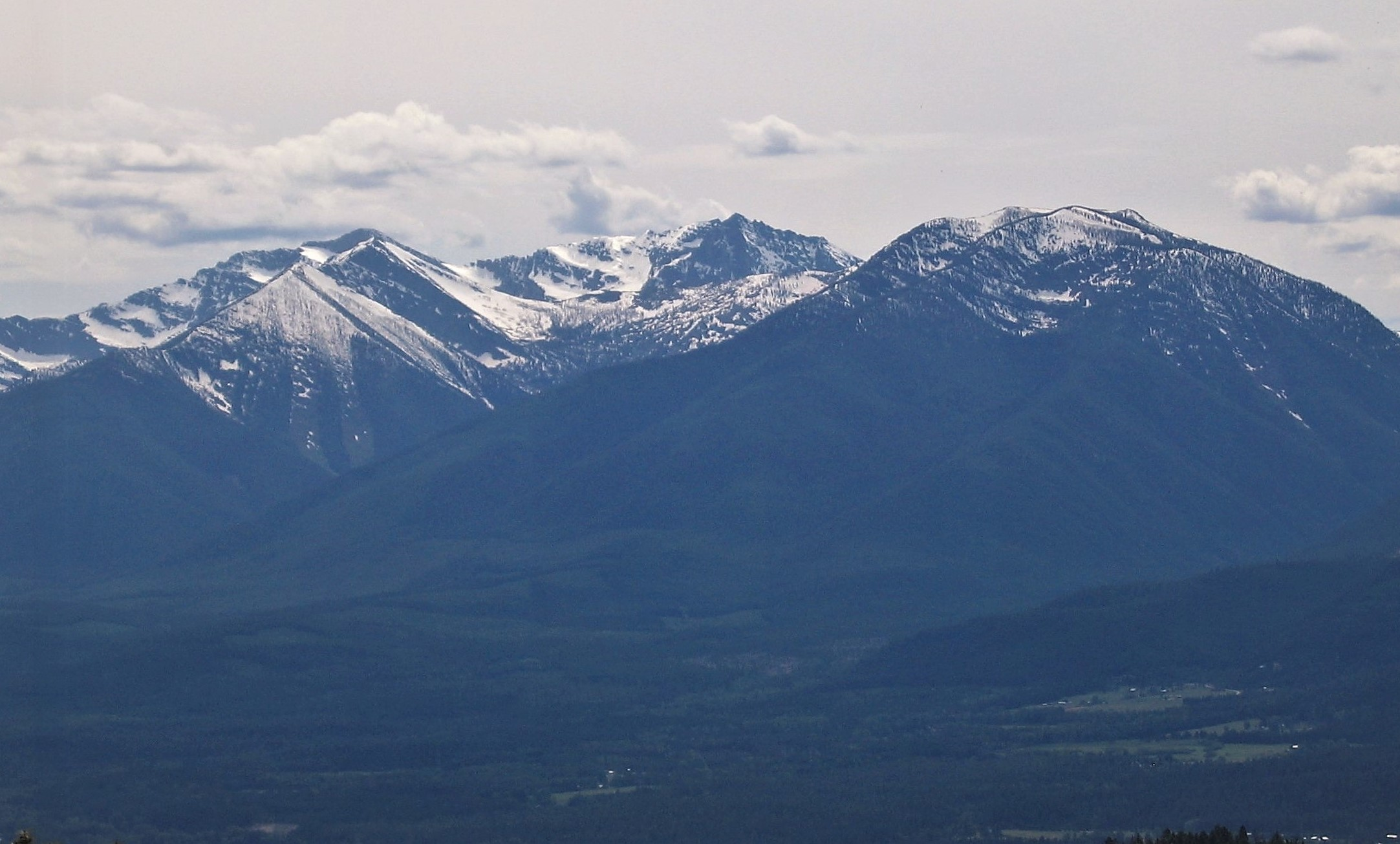
- Northeast aspect, centered

Highest point
- Elevation: 8,634 ft (2,632 m)
- Prominence: 534 ft (163 m)
- Parent peak: Snowshoe Peak
- Isolation: 1.17 mi (1.88 km)
- Coordinates: 48°14′18″N 115°41′56″W

Geography
- Location within Montana Location within the United States
- Country: United States
- State: Montana
- County: Lincoln / Sanders
- Protected area: Cabinet Mountains Wilderness
- Parent range: Cabinet Mountains
- Topo map: USGS Snowshoe Peak

A Peak is an 8,634-foot-elevation (2,632-meter) mountain summit located on the border shared by Lincoln and Sanders counties in Montana.

== Description ==
A Peak is located 12 miles (19 km) southwest of Libby, Montana, in the Cabinet Mountains Wilderness, on land managed by Kaniksu National Forest and Kootenai National Forest. It is set west of the Continental Divide in the Cabinet Mountains which are a subrange of the Rocky Mountains. A Peak ranks as the second-highest summit in the Cabinet Mountains, the second-highest summit in Lincoln County and the second-highest in Sanders County. Precipitation runoff from the mountain's east slope drains into Granite Creek which is part of the Kootenai River watershed, whereas the west slope drains into the North Fork Bull River which is within the Clark Fork River watershed. Topographic relief is significant as the summit rises over 4,000 feet (1,200 m) above Granite Lake in 0.7 mile (1.1 km) and 3,900 feet (1,200 m) above the North Fork Bull River in 1.7 mile (2.7 km). The mountain's toponym has been officially adopted by the U.S. Board on Geographic Names.

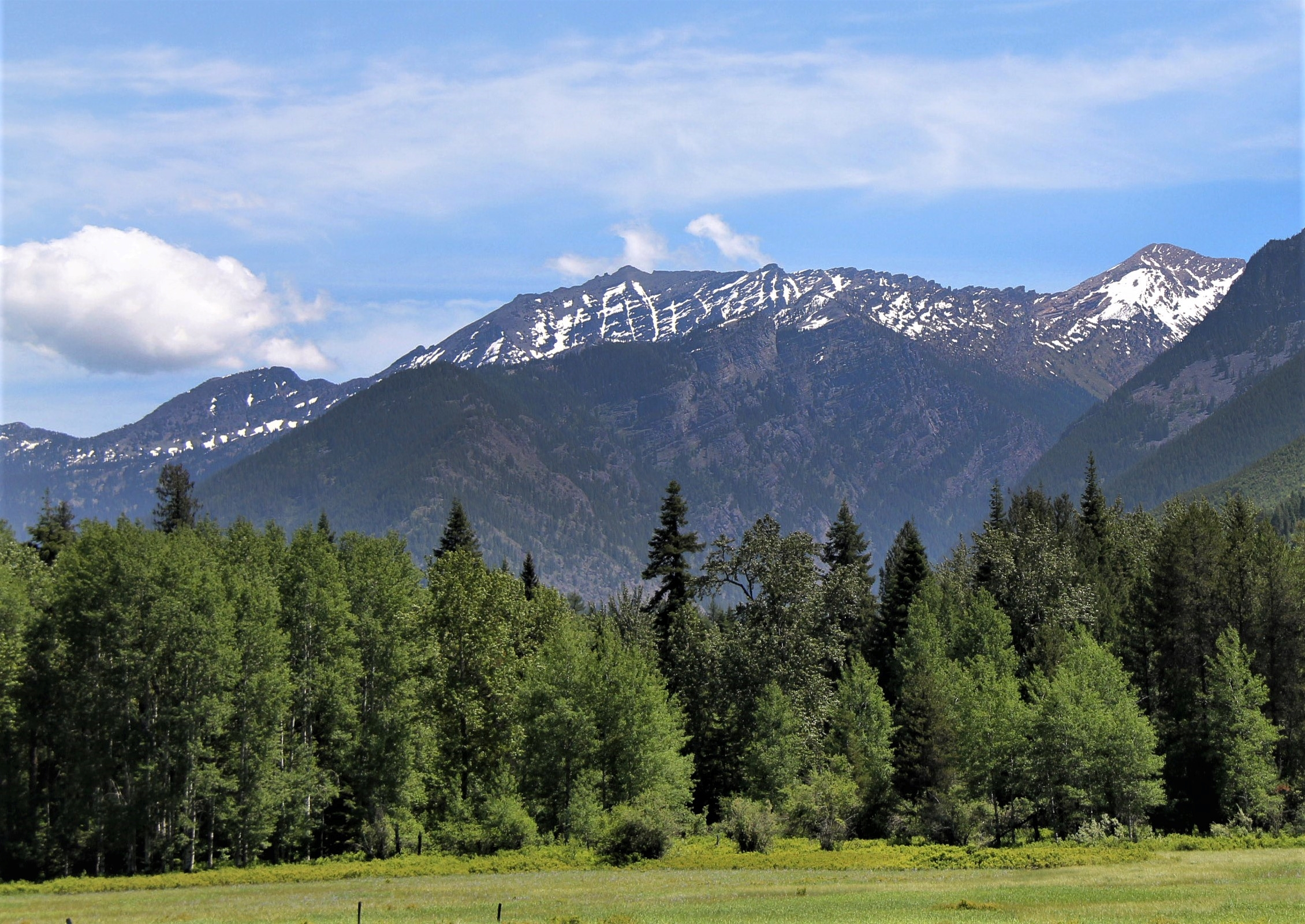
West aspect of A Peak centered in back of Scotty Peak, with Snowshoe Peak in upper right corner.

== Climate ==
Based on the Köppen climate classification, A Peak is located in a subarctic climate zone characterized by long, usually very cold winters, and cool to mild summers. Winter temperatures can drop below −10 °F with wind chill factors below −30 °F.

== See also ==
- Geology of the Rocky Mountains
