= Flatiron Mountain =

Flatiron Mountain may refer to:

- Flatiron Mountain (Idaho), mountain peak in Lemhi County, Idaho
- Flatiron Mountain (Lincoln County, Montana), mountain in Montana
- Flatiron Mountain (Madison County, Montana), mountain in Montana
- Flatiron Mountain (Powell County, Montana), mountain in Montana

== See also ==
- Flatirons, rock formations near Boulder, Colorado that are part of Green Mountain
