= Ojibway Peak =

Mountain in Montana, United States

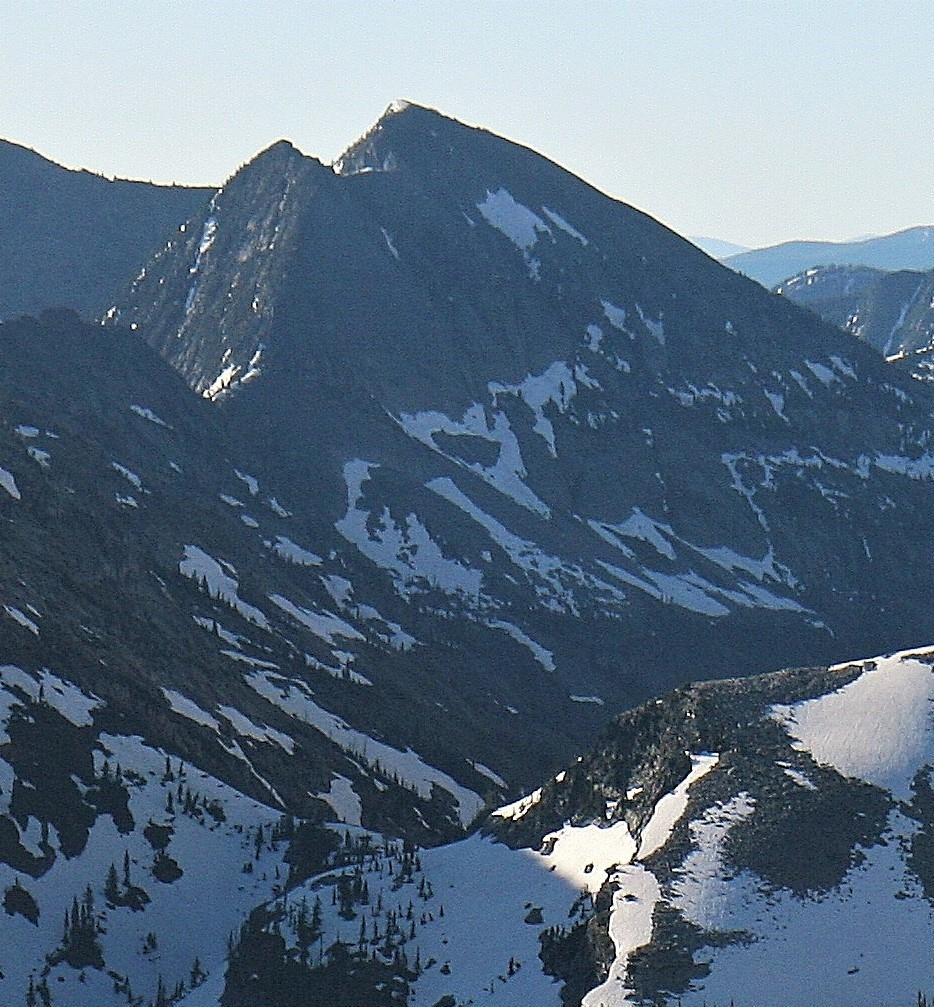
- Northwest aspect

Highest point
- Elevation: 7,303 ft (2,226 m)
- Prominence: 363 ft (111 m)
- Parent peak: Twin Peaks (7,563 ft)
- Isolation: 0.87 mi (1.40 km)
- Coordinates: 48°03′43″N 115°36′56″W

Naming
- Etymology: Ojibway

Geography
- Location within Montana Location within the United States
- Country: United States
- State: Montana
- County: Lincoln / Sanders
- Protected area: Cabinet Mountains Wilderness
- Parent range: Cabinet Mountains
- Topo map: USGS Howard Lake

Ojibway Peak is a 7,303-foot-elevation (2,226-meter) mountain summit located on the border shared by Lincoln and Sanders counties in Montana.

== Description ==
Ojibway Peak is located 22 miles (35 km) south of Libby, Montana, in the Cabinet Mountains Wilderness, on land managed by Kaniksu National Forest and Kootenai National Forest. It is set west of the Continental Divide in the Cabinet Mountains which are a subrange of the Rocky Mountains. Precipitation runoff from the mountain's east slope drains into Libby Creek which is a tributary of the Kootenai River, whereas the west slope drains into Rock Creek which is a tributary of the Clark Fork River. Topographic relief is significant as the summit rises over 3,300 feet (1,000 m) above Rock Creek in one mile (1.6 km) and 2,345 feet (715 m) above Rock Lake in 0.6 mile (1 km). The mountain's toponym was officially adopted in 1923 by the U.S. Board on Geographic Names and the name is a Native American word.

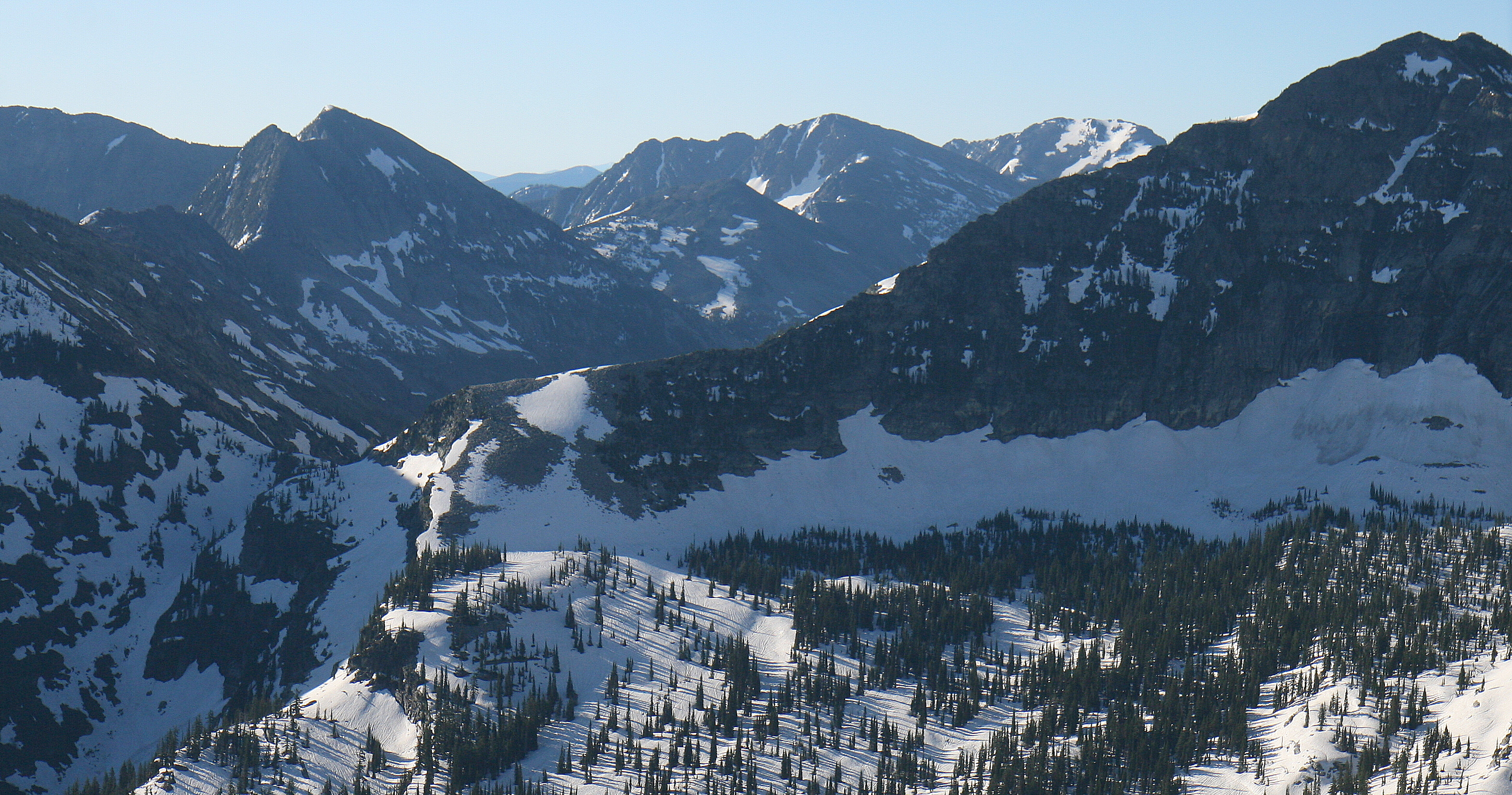
Cabinet Mountains. Ojibway Peak to left

== Climate ==
Based on the Köppen climate classification, Ojibway Peak is located in a subarctic climate zone characterized by long, usually very cold winters, and cool to mild summers. Winter temperatures can drop below −10 °F with wind chill factors below −30 °F.

== See also ==
- Geology of the Rocky Mountains
