= Flat Top Mountain (Montana) =

Mountain in Montana, United States

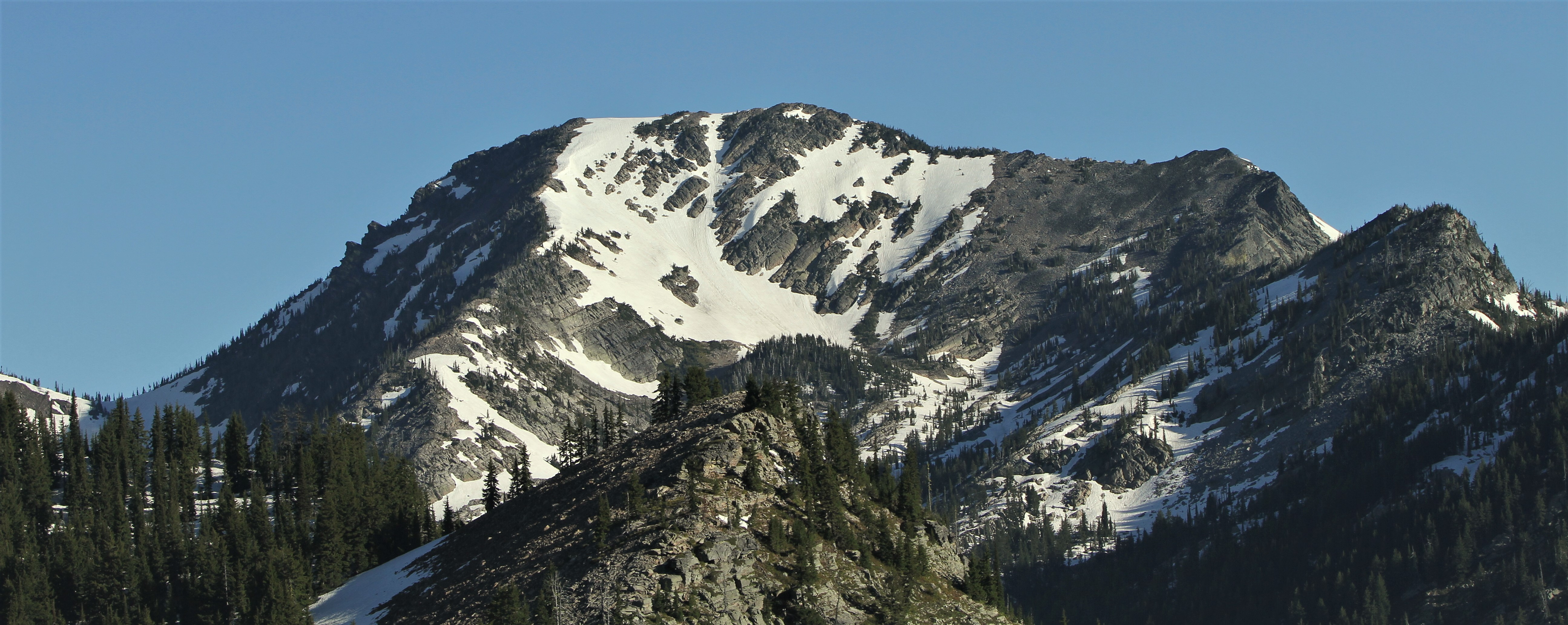
- South aspect

Highest point
- Elevation: 7,608 ft (2,319 m)
- Prominence: 1,188 ft (362 m)
- Parent peak: Elephant Peak (7,938 ft)
- Isolation: 4.34 mi (6.98 km)
- Coordinates: 48°01′48″N 115°35′56″W

Geography
- Location within Montana Location within the United States
- Country: United States
- State: Montana
- County: Sanders / Lincoln
- Protected area: Cabinet Mountains Wilderness
- Parent range: Cabinet Mountains
- Topo map: USGS Howard Lake

Flat Top Mountain is a 7,608-foot-elevation (2,319-meter) mountain summit located along the border shared by Lincoln and Sanders counties in Montana.

== Description ==
Flat Top Mountain is located 9 miles (14 km) east-northeast of Noxon, Montana, in the Cabinet Mountains Wilderness, on land managed by Kaniksu National Forest and Kootenai National Forest. It is set west of the Continental Divide in the Cabinet Mountains which are a subrange of the Rocky Mountains. Flat Top Mountain ranks as the 10th-highest summit in the Cabinet Mountains, and the 12th-highest in Sanders County. Precipitation runoff from the mountain's east slope drains into Mill Creek which is part of the Fisher River watershed, whereas the other slopes drain into Rock and Swamp creeks which are tributaries of the Clark Fork River. Topographic relief is significant as the summit rises 2,100 feet (640 m) above Ozette Lake in one-half mile (0.8 km) and 2,500 feet (760 m) above Wanless Lake in approximately one mile (1.6 km). The mountain's toponym has been officially adopted by the U.S. Board on Geographic Names.

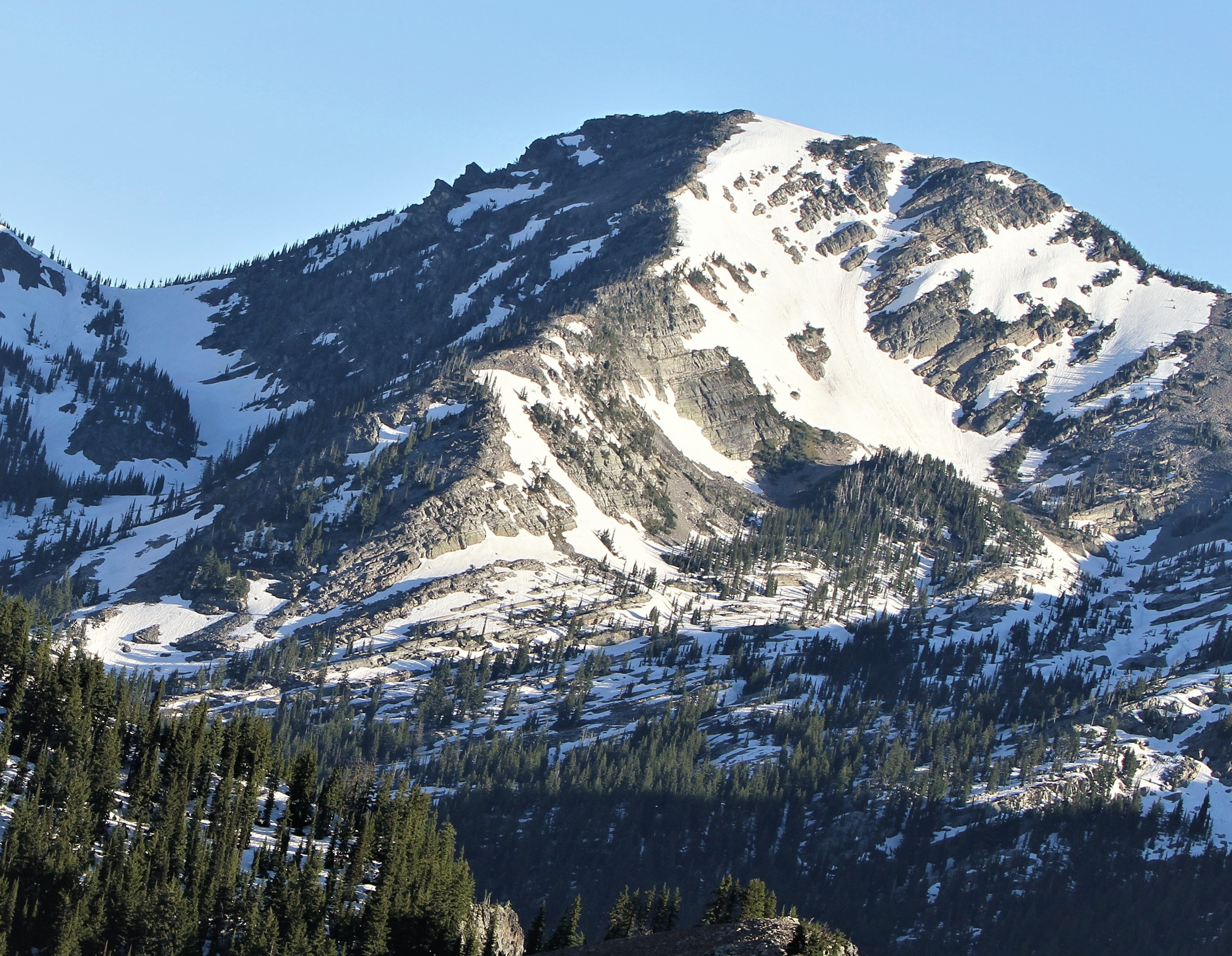
Flat Top Mountain

== Climate ==
Based on the Köppen climate classification, Flat Top Mountain is located in a subarctic climate zone characterized by long, usually very cold winters, and cool to mild summers. Winter temperatures can drop below −10 °F with wind chill factors below −30 °F.

== See also ==
- Geology of the Rocky Mountains
