= Suede (disambiguation) =

Suede is a type of soft, napped leather.

Suede may also refer to:

== Music ==
- Suede (band), an English rock band
- Suede (album), by Suede, 1993
- "Suede" (song), by NxWorries, 2015
- "Suede", a song by Tori Amos from To Venus and Back, 1999

== People ==
- Suede (singer), American pop and jazz singer
- Stephen "Suede" Baum (born 1970), American fashion designer
- DJ Suede the Remix God (born 1990), American music producer

== See also ==
- Swede (disambiguation)
