= Saint Paul Peak =

Mountain in Montana, United States

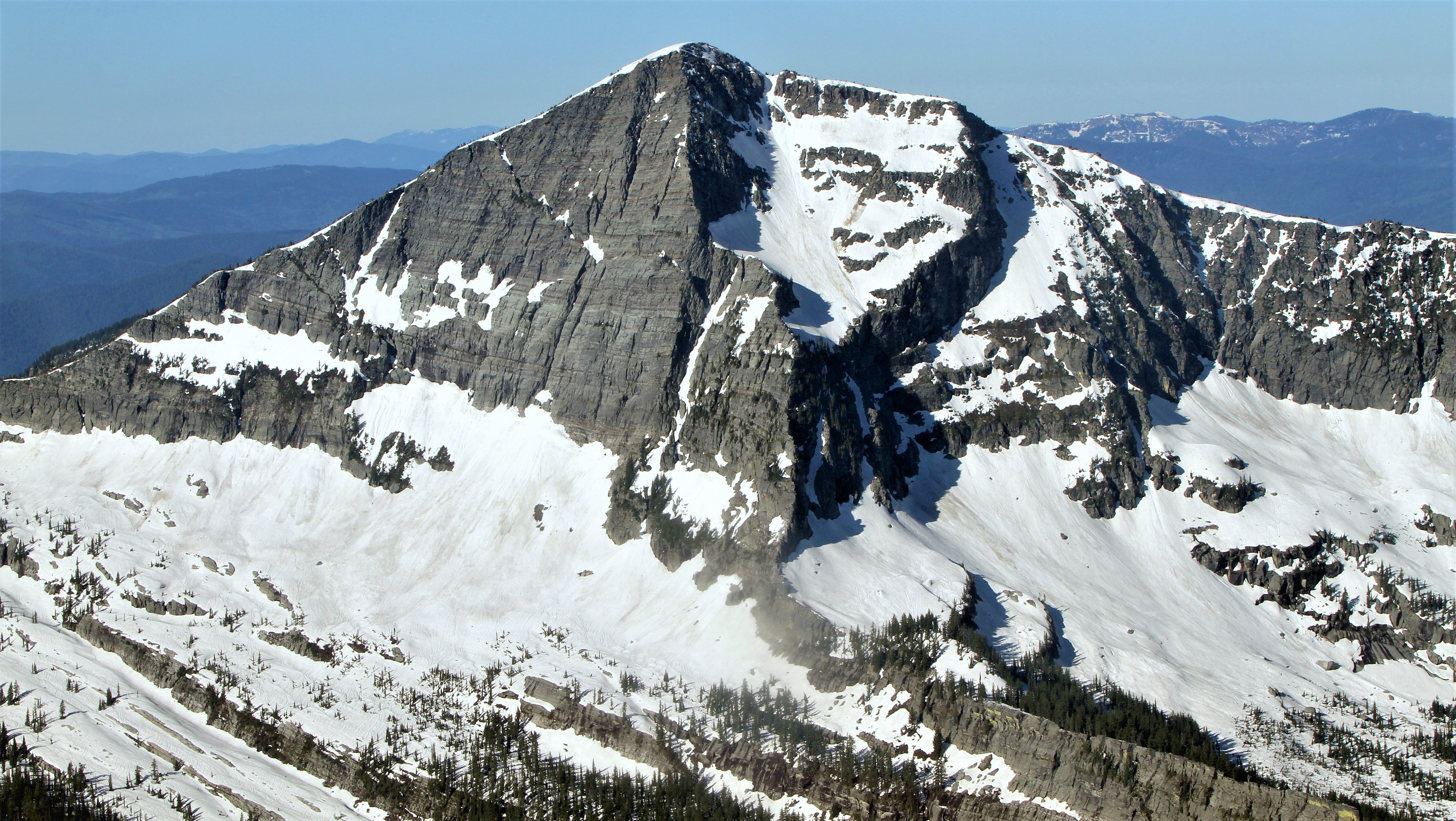
- Northeast aspect

Highest point
- Elevation: 7,714 ft (2,351 m)
- Prominence: 1,629 ft (497 m)
- Parent peak: Elephant Peak (7,938 ft)
- Isolation: 2.15 mi (3.46 km)
- Coordinates: 48°04′44″N 115°40′35″W

Geography
- Location within Montana Location within the United States
- Country: United States
- State: Montana
- County: Sanders
- Protected area: Cabinet Mountains Wilderness
- Parent range: Cabinet Mountains
- Topo map: USGS Elephant Peak

Saint Paul Peak is a 7,714-foot-elevation (2,351-meter) mountain summit in Sanders County, Montana.

== Description ==
Saint Paul Peak is located 21 miles (34 km) south-southwest of Libby, Montana, in the Cabinet Mountains Wilderness, on land managed by Kaniksu National Forest. It is set west of the Continental Divide in the Cabinet Mountains which are a subrange of the Rocky Mountains. Saint Paul Peak ranks as the fifth-highest summit in the Cabinet Mountains, and the eighth-highest in Sanders County. Precipitation runoff from the mountain drains into tributaries of the Clark Fork River. Topographic relief is significant as the summit rises 3,000 feet (910 m) above Saint Paul Lake in one mile (1.6 km). Chicago Peak and Milwaukee Pass lie one-half mile immediately southwest of Saint Paul Peak, a nod to the Chicago, Milwaukee, St. Paul and Pacific Railroad. The mountain's toponym has been officially adopted by the U.S. Board on Geographic Names.

== Climate ==
Based on the Köppen climate classification, Saint Paul Peak is located in a subarctic climate zone characterized by long, usually very cold winters, and cool to mild summers. Winter temperatures can drop below −10 °F with wind chill factors below −30 °F.

== See also ==
- Geology of the Rocky Mountains
