= Lost Soul Mountain =

Mountain in Montana, United States

Coordinates: 48°34′56″N 115°25′55″W

Lost Soul Mountain is a summit in Lincoln County, Montana, in the United States. With an elevation of 6,155 feet (1,876 m), Lost Soul Mountain is the 1880th highest summit in the state of Montana.
