= Swede (nickname) =

Swede is a nickname for:

- Carl Anderson (American football) (1898–1978), American college football head coach
- Swede Ellstrom (1906–1994), American National Football League player
- Geary Eppley (1895–1978), American university administrator, professor, agronomist, military officer, athlete and track and field coach
- Swede Hagberg (1907–1960), American National Football League player
- Swede Halbrook (1933–1988), American National Basketball Association player
- Andy Hansen (1924-2002), American Major League Baseball pitcher
- Tom Hanson (American football) (1907–1985), American National Football League player
- Swede Johnston (1910–2002), American National Football League player
- Swede Knox (1948–2021), Canadian hockey linesman
- Swede Larson (c. 1899–1945), 23rd head football coach for the United States Naval Academy
- Hugo Leistner (1902–2002), American hurdler
- Swede Masin (1920–2005), American multi-sport college athlete and professional basketball player
- Charles Momsen (1896–1967), American pioneer in submarine rescue and US Navy vice admiral
- Swede Nordstrom (1896–1963), American National Football League player
- Andy Oberlander (1905–1968), All-American football halfback
- Norman Ralston (1916–2007), American pilot, flight instructor and businessman
- Erwin Righter (1897–1985), college football and basketball player and coach
- Swede Risberg (1894–1975), American Major League Baseball player
- Swede Roos (1913–1979), American professional basketball player and coach
- Swede Savage (1946–1973), American race car driver
- Swede Vejtasa (1914–2013), American World War II flying ace
- Swede Youngstrom (1897–1968), American National Football League player

== See also ==
- Tillie Anderson (1875–1965), Swedish-born American road and track cyclist known as "the Terrible Swede"
- John Lawson (cyclist) (1872–1902), Swedish-American professional cyclist known as "the Terrible Swede"
- Emory Parnell (1892–1979), American vaudeville performer and actor nicknamed "the Big Swede"
