= Sex Peak =

Mountain in Montana, United States

Coordinates: 47°43′22″N 115°38′43″W

Sex Peak is a summit in Sanders County, Montana, in the United States. It is located within the Kootenai National Forest. It has an elevation of 5,751 feet (1,753 m)

A conversation between a park official and a forester about sexual intercourse supposedly caused the name Sex Peak to be selected.

Atop Sex Peak stands the Sex Peak Lookout Station, a decommissioned fire lookout tower which is now available for rental for overnight recreational visits from the United States Forest Service.
