= Swede Lake =

Lake in the state of Minnesota, United States

- Location within Minnesota
- Location: Carver County, Minnesota
- Coordinates: 44°55′47″N 93°49′10″W
- Type: lake

Swede Lake is a lake in Carver County, Minnesota, in the United States.

Several Swedish immigrants settled at Swede Lake, causing its name to be selected.
