= Beaver Peak =

Mountain in Nevada, United States

Coordinates: 41°04′34″N 116°15′15″W

Beaver Peak is a summit in the U.S. state of Nevada. The elevation is 8,783 feet (2,677 m).

Beaver Peak was named for the North American beavers in the area.
