= Snowshoe Peak =

Mountain in Montana, United States

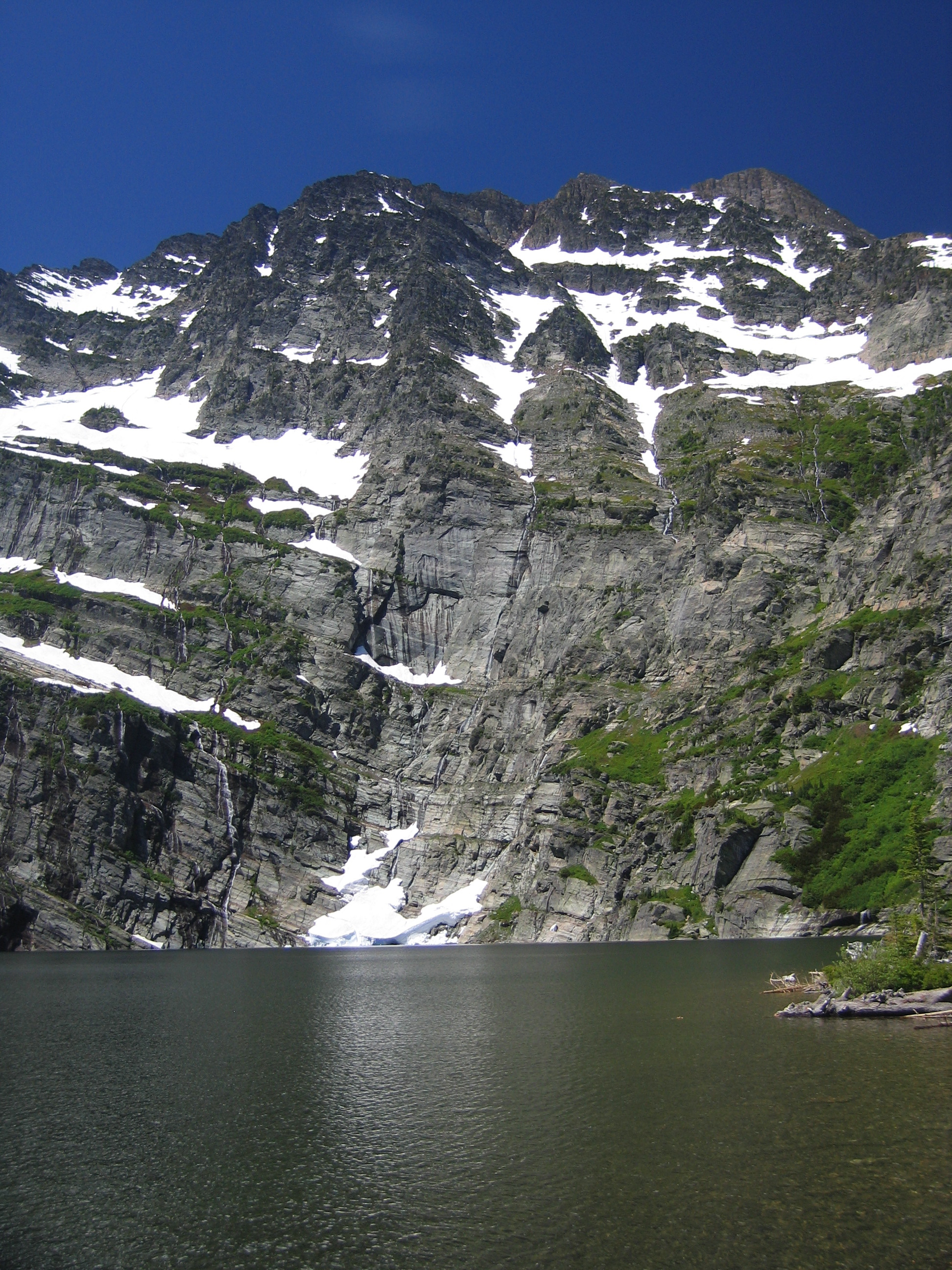
- Snowshoe Peak from Leigh Lake

Highest point
- Elevation: 8,738 ft (2,663 m)
- Prominence: 5,418 ft (1,651 m)
- Listing: US most prominent peaks 92nd
- Coordinates: 48°13′23″N 115°41′22″W

Geography
- Location within Montana
- Location: Cabinet Mountains Wilderness, Lincoln / Sanders counties, Montana, U.S.
- Parent range: Cabinet Mountains
- Topo map: USGS Snowshoe Peak

Climbing
- Easiest route: West approach (Class 3), though the standard route (northeast ridge) is shorter

Snowshoe Peak is a mountain in the U.S. state of Montana. At 8,738 ft (2,663 m), it is the highest peak in the Cabinet Mountains of Northwestern Montana and Idaho.

== Climate ==
Climate data for Snowshoe Peak 48.2343 N, 115.6985 W, Elevation: 8,051 ft (2,454 m) (1991–2020 normals)
Month	Jan	Feb	Mar	Apr	May	Jun	Jul	Aug	Sep	Oct	Nov	Dec	Year
Mean daily maximum °F (°C)	23.4 (−4.8)	23.8 (−4.6)	27.4 (−2.6)	34.2 (1.2)	43.5 (6.4)	50.8 (10.4)	61.7 (16.5)	62.3 (16.8)	53.9 (12.2)	40.3 (4.6)	27.6 (−2.4)	22.2 (−5.4)	39.3 (4.0)
Daily mean °F (°C)	18.0 (−7.8)	17.3 (−8.2)	20.0 (−6.7)	25.6 (−3.6)	34.3 (1.3)	41.0 (5.0)	50.5 (10.3)	50.6 (10.3)	42.9 (6.1)	31.9 (−0.1)	22.3 (−5.4)	17.1 (−8.3)	31.0 (−0.6)
Mean daily minimum °F (°C)	12.7 (−10.7)	10.9 (−11.7)	12.6 (−10.8)	16.9 (−8.4)	25.1 (−3.8)	31.2 (−0.4)	39.3 (4.1)	39.0 (3.9)	32.0 (0.0)	23.6 (−4.7)	17.0 (−8.3)	11.9 (−11.2)	22.7 (−5.2)
Average precipitation inches (mm)	11.95 (304)	9.75 (248)	10.23 (260)	7.10 (180)	6.70 (170)	6.56 (167)	1.79 (45)	1.69 (43)	4.48 (114)	8.59 (218)	12.42 (315)	11.32 (288)	92.58 (2,352)
Source: PRISM Climate Group

== See also ==
- List of mountain peaks of North America
  - List of mountain peaks of the United States
    - List of Ultras of the United States
