= Swede Mountain =

Mountain in New York, United States

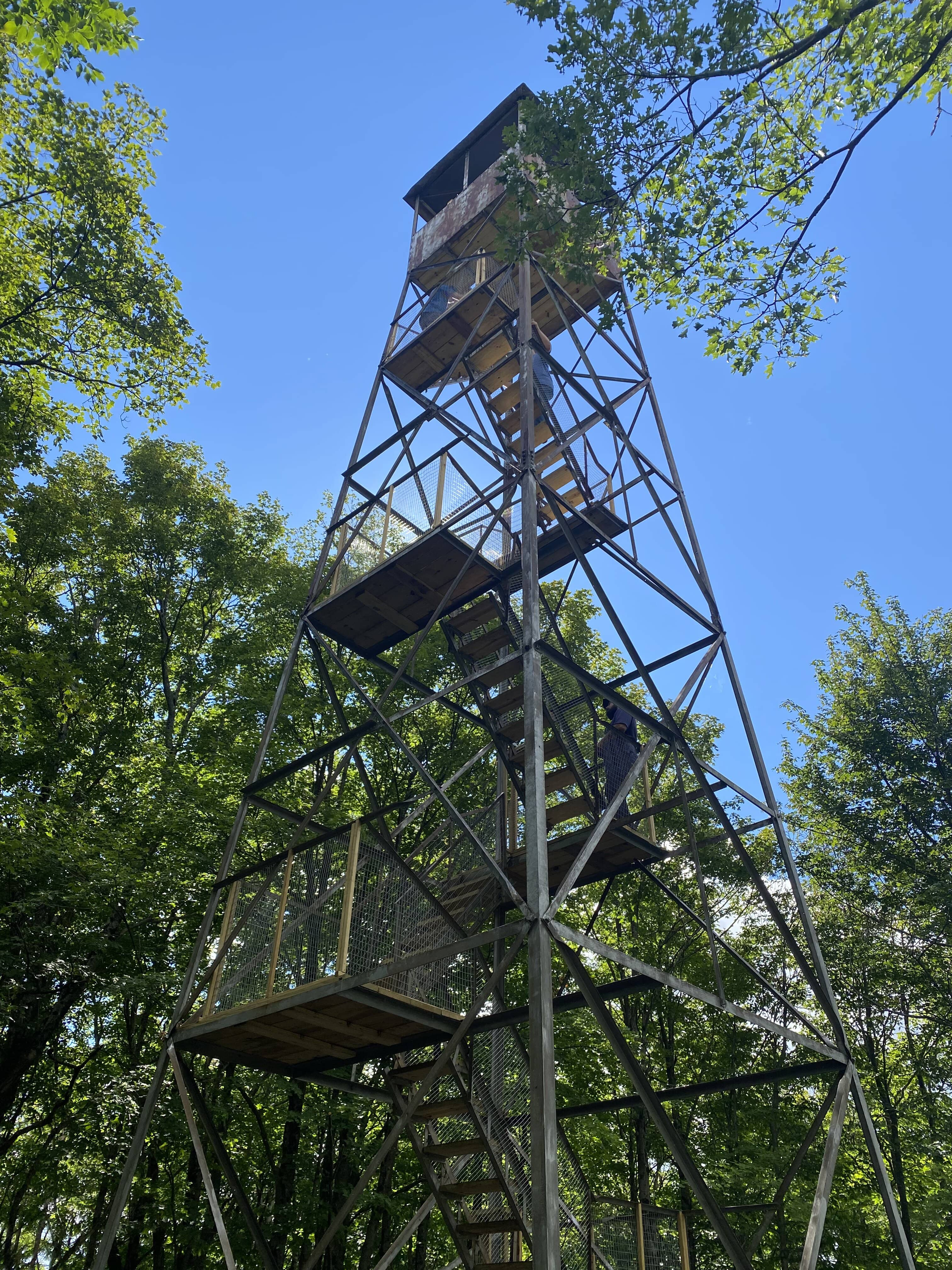
- Swede Mountain fire tower

Highest point
- Elevation: 1,900 feet (580 m)
- Coordinates: 43°44′11″N 73°35′28″W

Geography
- Location within New York Adirondack Park Location within the United States
- Location: Warren County, New York, U.S.
- Topo map: USGS Silver Bay

Swede Mountain is a mountain in the Adirondack Mountains region of New York. It is located southwest of Ticonderoga and north of Glens Falls in Warren County. The Swede Mountain Fire Observation Station is located on top of the mountain.

== History ==
The first structure built on Swede Mountain was a wooden tower erected by the Conservation Commission in 1912. In 1918, the wood tower was replaced with a 47-foot-tall (14 m) Aermotor LS40 tower.

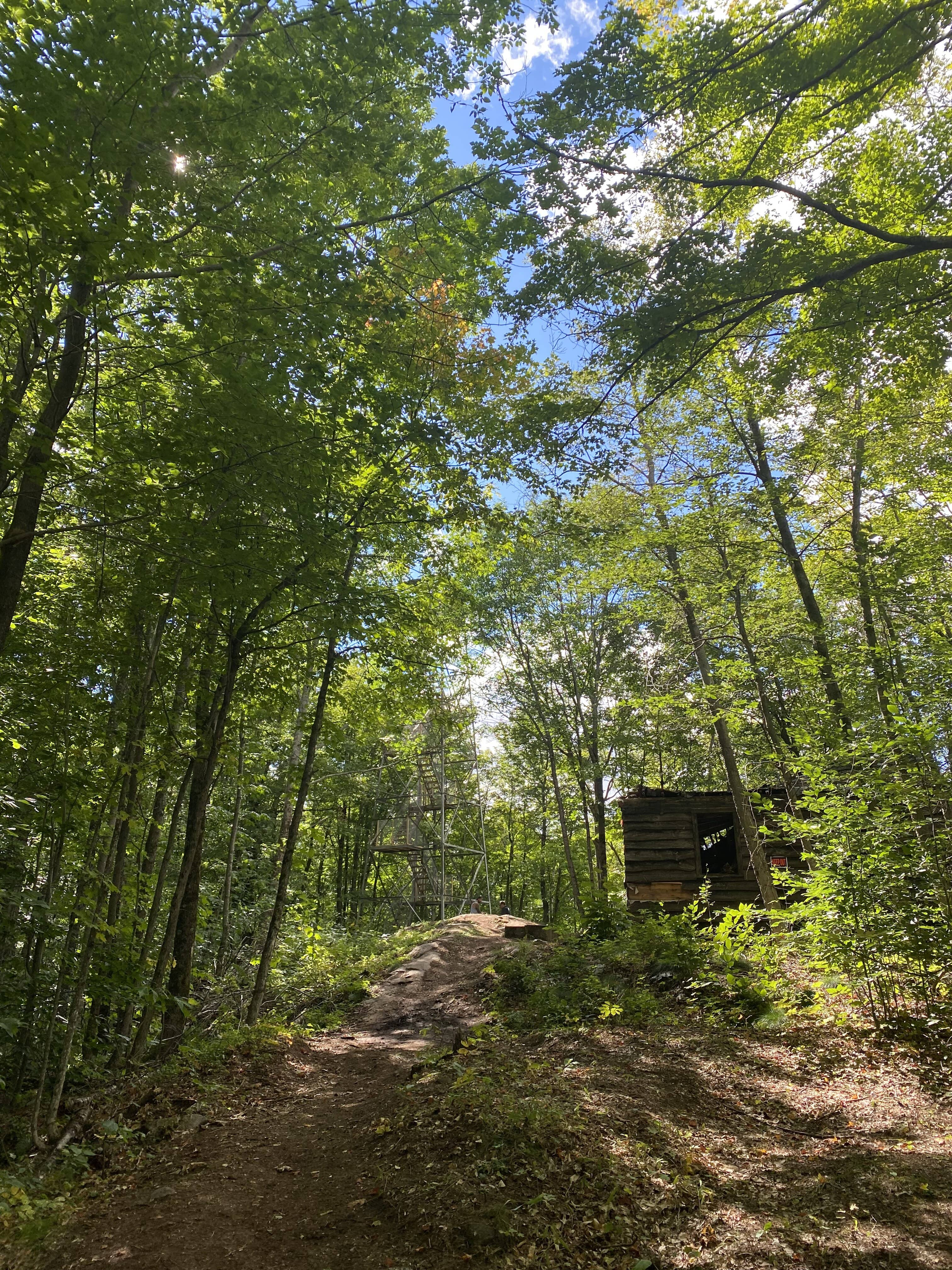
Approaching the Swede Mountain tower

The fire tower was decommissioned for fire watch purposes by New York State in 1968. The tower and a small parcel of land was purchased by Warren County in 1995, as a site for radio communication equipment. The fire tower was rehabilitated in the spring and summer of 2021, by the Warren County Parks and Recreation Department and Public Works staff. Also a trail was made from New York State Route 8, at North Pond. The fire tower and trail to the tower was opened to the public on August 13, 2021.
