= Elephant Peak =

Mountain in Montana, United States

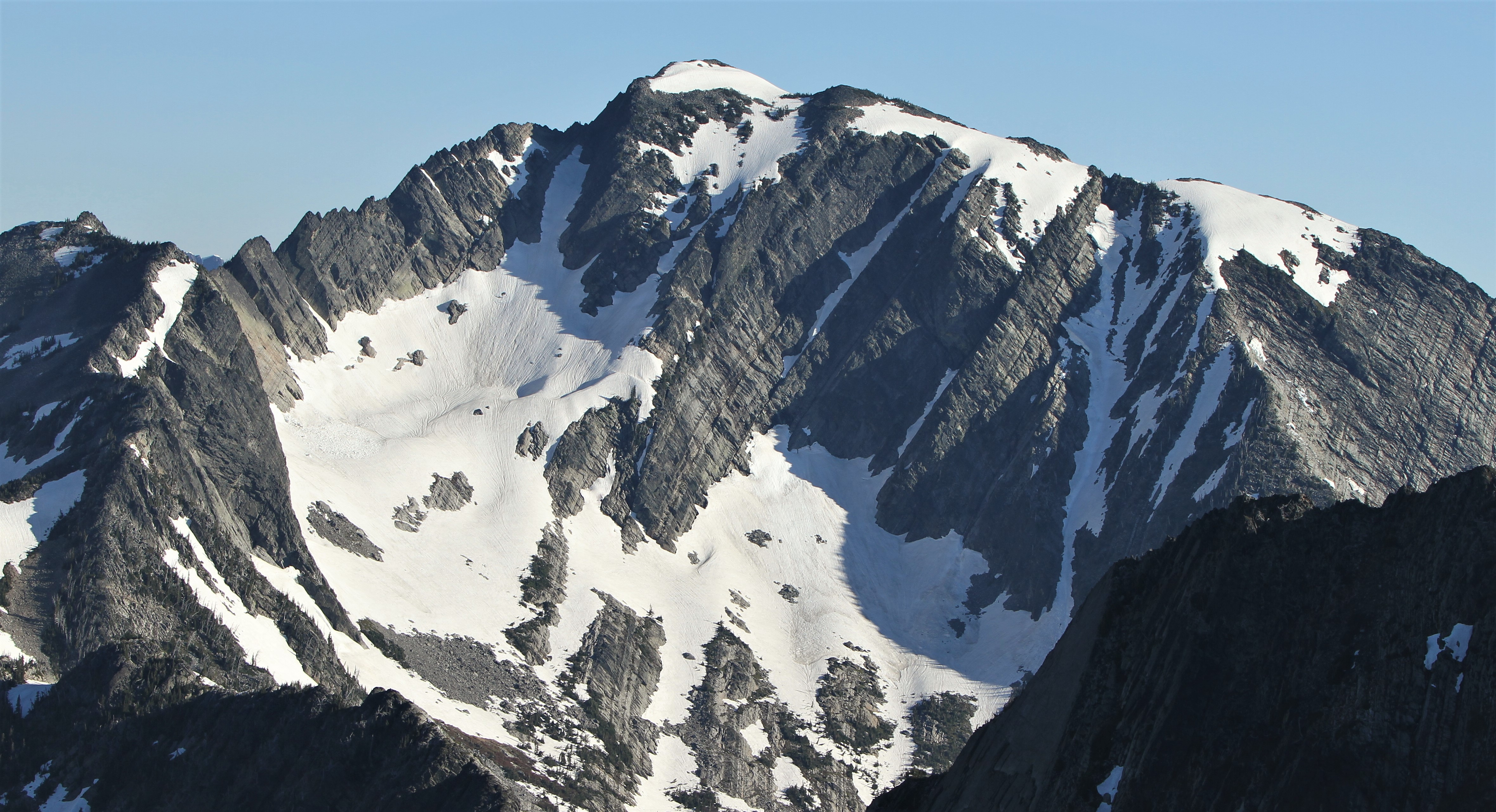
- South aspect

Highest point
- Elevation: 7,938 ft (2,420 m)
- Prominence: 1,678 ft (511 m)
- Isolation: 8.38 mi (13.49 km)
- Coordinates: 48°05′18″N 115°37′55″W

Geography
- Location within Montana Location within the United States
- Country: United States
- State: Montana
- County: Lincoln / Sanders
- Protected area: Cabinet Mountains Wilderness
- Parent range: Cabinet Mountains
- Topo map: USGS Elephant Peak

Elephant Peak is a 7,938-foot-elevation (2,420-meter) mountain summit located on the border shared by Lincoln and Sanders counties in Montana.

== Description ==
Elephant Peak is located 20 miles (32 km) south of Libby, Montana, in the Cabinet Mountains Wilderness, on land managed by Kaniksu National Forest and Kootenai National Forest. It is set west of the Continental Divide in the Cabinet Mountains which are a subrange of the Rocky Mountains. Elephant Peak ranks as the fourth-highest summit in the Cabinet Mountains, fourth-highest summit in Lincoln County and the fifth-highest in Sanders County. Precipitation runoff from the mountain's east slope drains into Libby Creek which is a tributary of the Kootenai River, whereas the west slope drains into headwaters of East Fork Bull River which is within the Clark Fork River watershed. Topographic relief is significant as the summit rises over 3,500 feet (1,100 m) above Libby Creek in 1.4 mile (2.25 km) and 3,200 feet (980 m) above Saint Paul Lake in 1.25 mile (2 km). The mountain's toponym was officially adopted in 1923 by the U.S. Board on Geographic Names and the name refers to the appearance of the mountain.

Compare to the photo of Elephant Peak

== Climate ==
Based on the Köppen climate classification, Elephant Peak is located in a subarctic climate zone characterized by long, usually very cold winters, and cool to mild summers. Winter temperatures can drop below −10 °F with wind chill factors below −30 °F. This climate supports a small glacier remnant on the north slope of the peak.

== See also ==
- Geology of the Rocky Mountains
