= Cabinet Mountains =

Mountain range in Idaho and Montana, United States

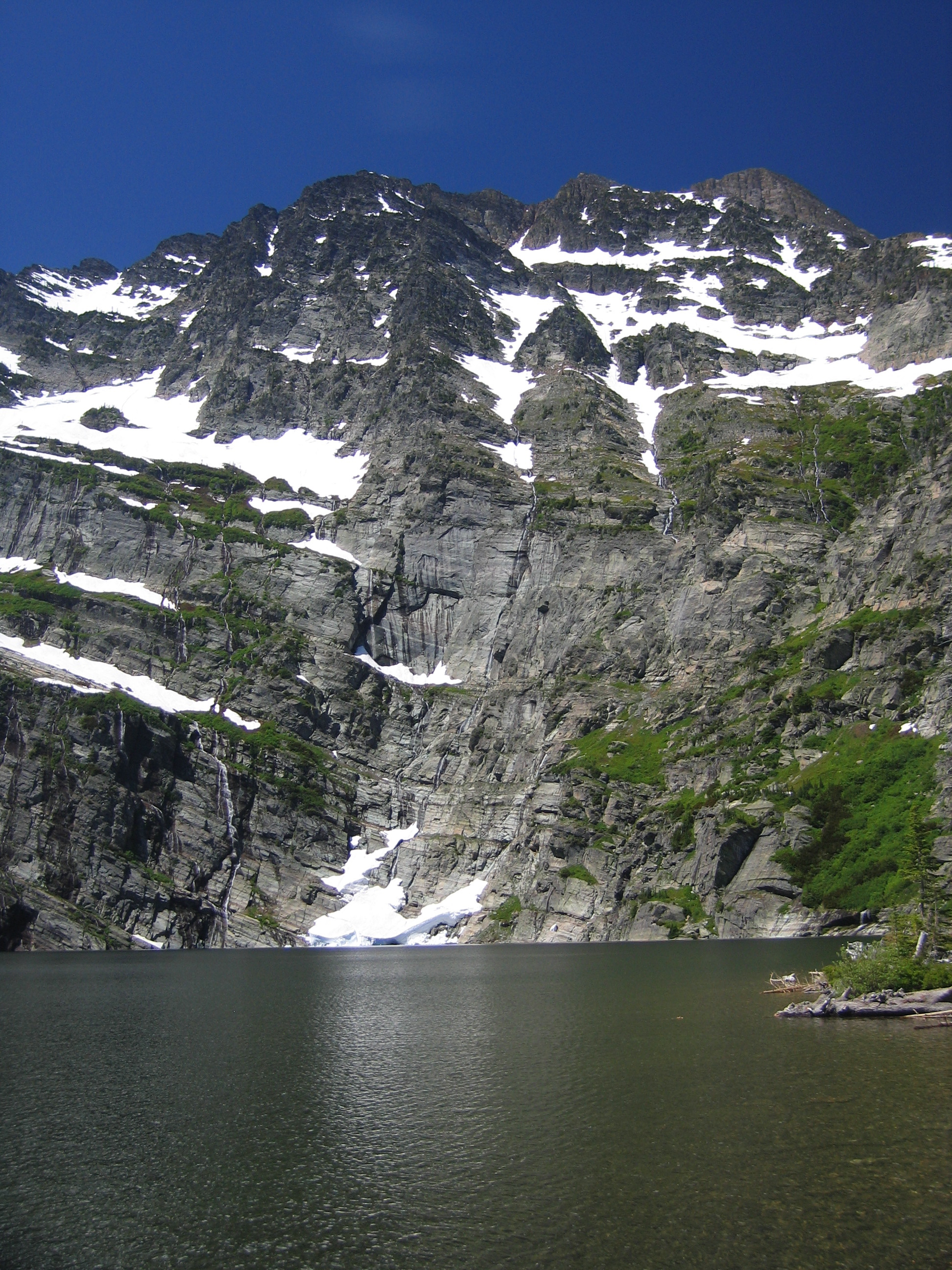
- Snowshoe Peak, highest point in the Cabinet Mountains

Highest point
- Peak: Snowshoe Peak
- Elevation: 8,738 ft (2,663 m)
- Coordinates: 48°13′N 115°41′W

Dimensions
- Area: 2,134 mi^{2} (5,530 km^{2})

Geography
- Country: United States
- States: Idaho and Montana
- Parent range: Rocky Mountains

The Cabinet Mountains are part of the Rocky Mountains, located in northwest Montana and the Idaho panhandle, in the United States. The mountains cover an area of 2,134 square miles (5,530 km^{2}). The Cabinet Mountains lie south of the Purcell Mountains, between the Kootenai River and Clark Fork River and Idaho's Lake Pend Oreille. The Cabinet Mountains lie to the east of the Purcell Trench. The Cabinet Mountains form the north side of the Clark Fork River valley in Idaho and Montana. The Cabinet Mountains Wilderness is located east of the Bull River near Noxon, Montana in roughly the center of the range.

The highest peaks are Snowshoe Peak (8,738 ft; 2,663 m), A Peak (8,634 ft; 2,632 m), Bockman Peak (8,174 ft; 2,491 m), Elephant Peak (7,938 ft; 2,420 m), and Saint Paul Peak (7,714 ft; 2,351 m). Although of lower altitude than many Rocky Mountain peaks to the east in Montana, the Cabinet Mountains offer a stark contrast as the surrounding river valleys are at such relative low altitude.

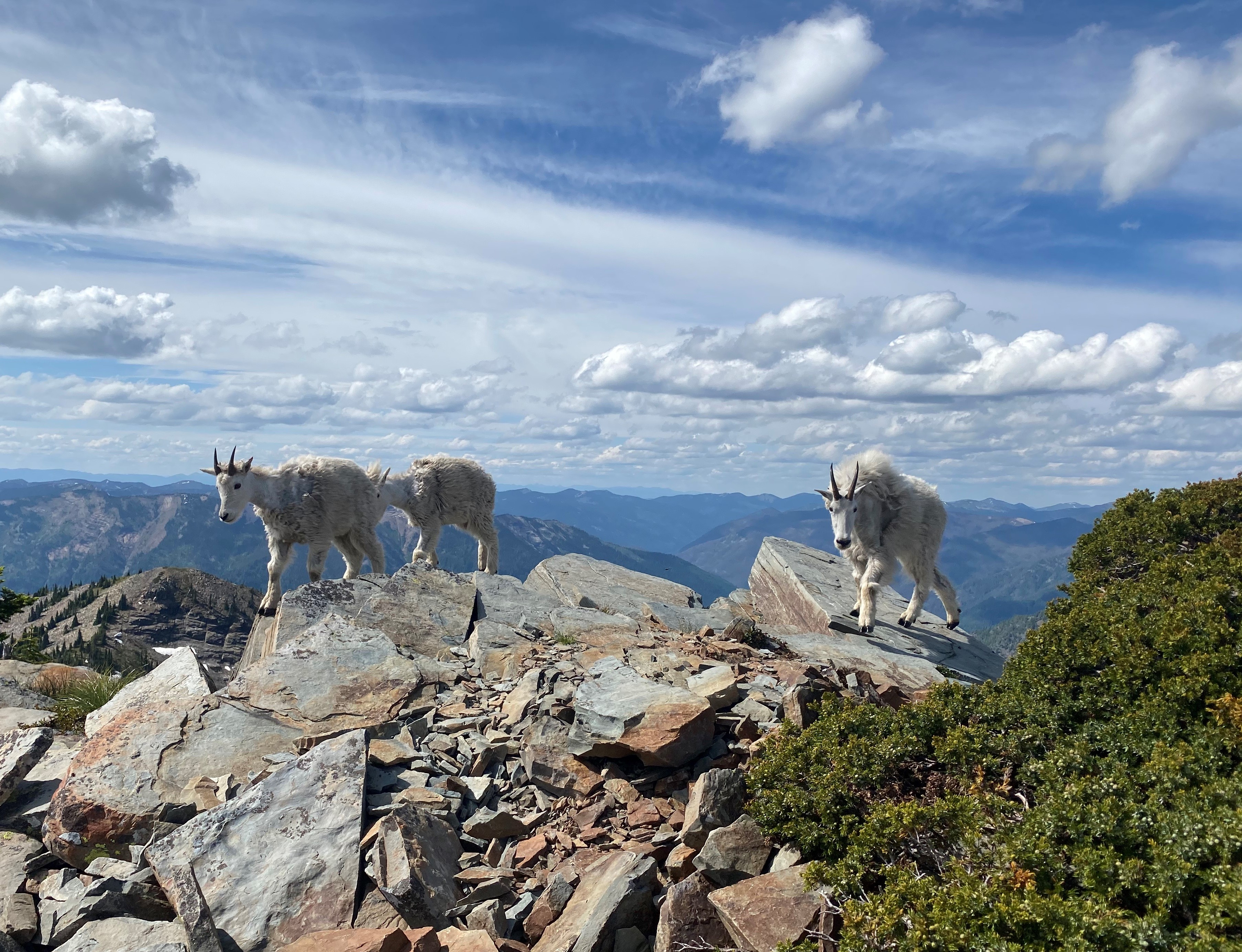
Mountain goats on Scotchman Peak

The Cabinets are noted, along with the nearby Selkirk Mountains to the west, as being some of the most "wild" mountains left in the contiguous United States. They are home to mule deer, elk, moose, bighorn sheep, black bear, grizzly bear, wolverine, wolves and many smaller species.

The Cabinet Mountain geology is also believed to be potentially rich in minerals.

In 1916, Congress considered a bill to create a Cabinet National Park. The idea was proposed again in 1933 but was ultimately rejected because the National Park Service director deemed the mountains to lack national significance.

== Landscape ==
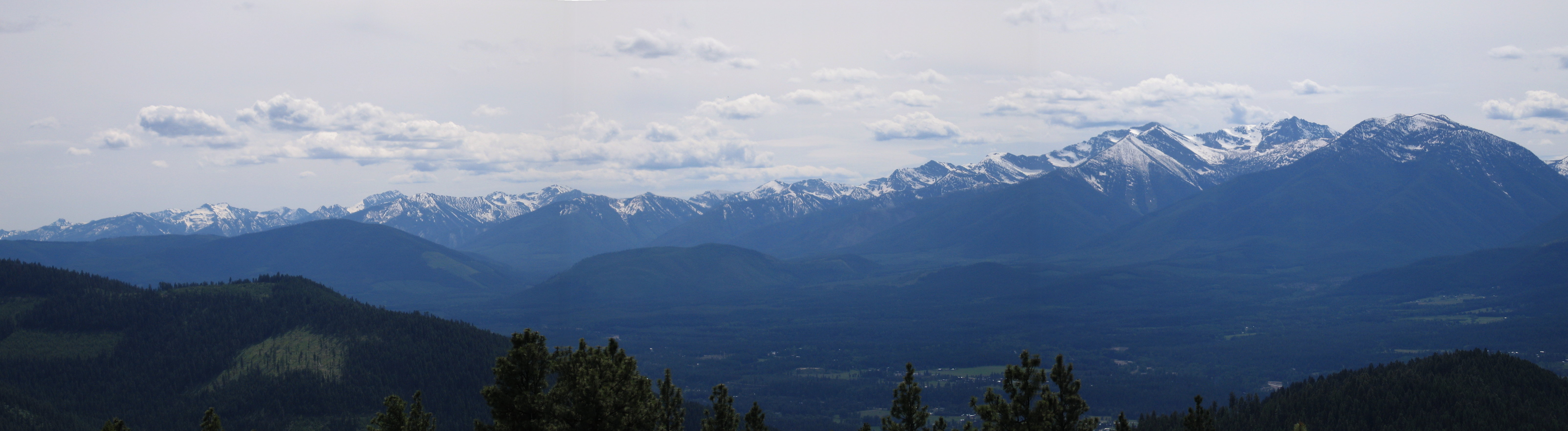
Panorama of the Cabinet Mountains south of Libby, Montana.

== See also ==
- List of mountain ranges in Montana
