= Cabinet Mountains Wilderness =

Protected area in Montana, United States

- IUCN category Ib (wilderness area)
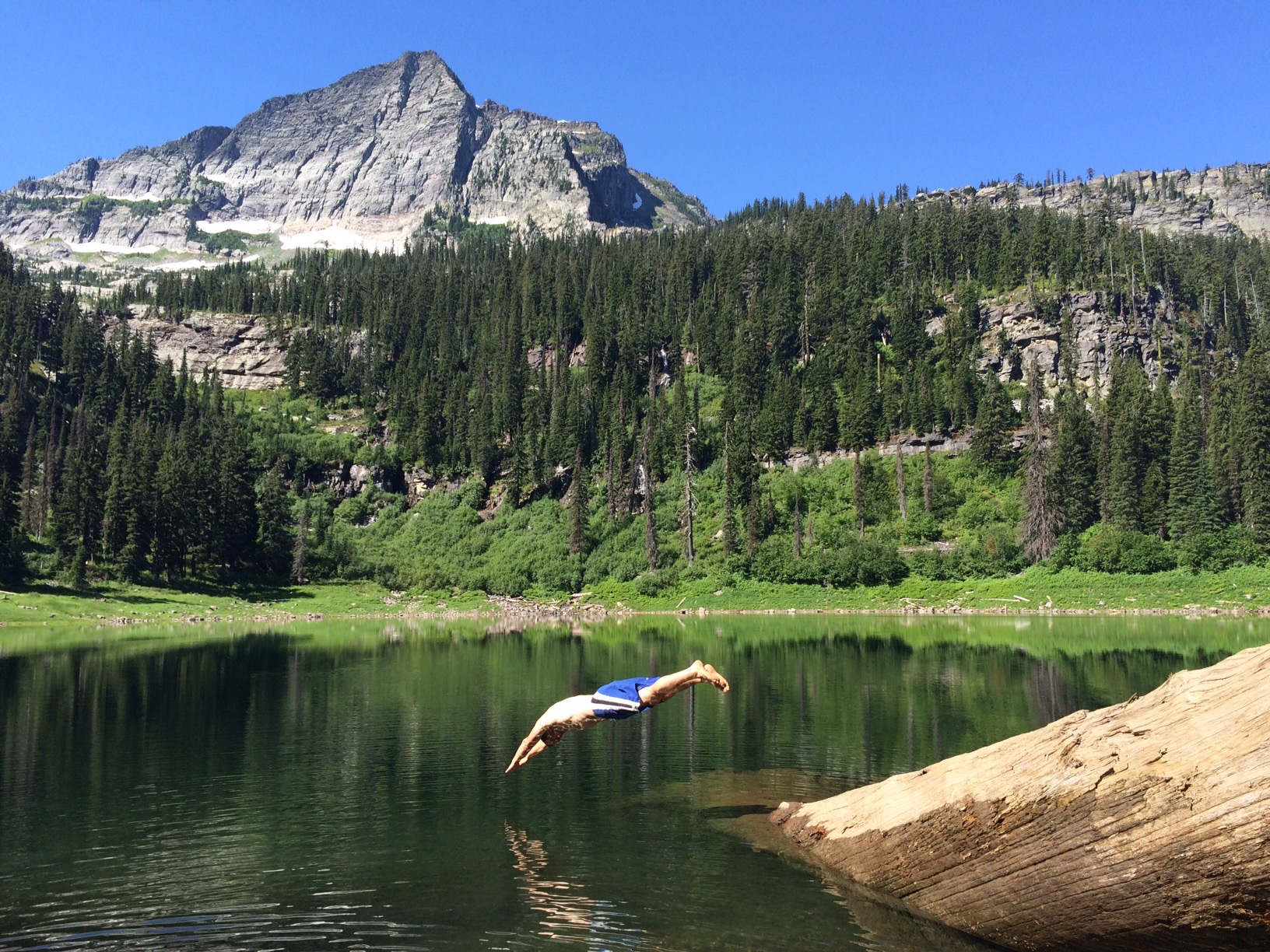

- Location within Montana Location within the United States
- Location: Lincoln / Sanders counties, Montana, USA
- Nearest city: Libby, MT
- Coordinates: 48°13′N 115°41′W
- Area: 94,272 acres (381.51 km^{2})
- Established: 1964
- Governing body: U.S. Forest Service

The Cabinet Mountains Wilderness, created by an act of Congress in 1964, is located in the U.S. state of Montana. Protecting the wildest portions of the Cabinet Mountains and an integral part of Kootenai National Forest and Kaniksu National Forest, the wilderness had enjoyed more limited protection since 1935 as a Primitive Area.

U.S. Wilderness Areas do not allow motorized or mechanized vehicles, including bicycles. Although camping and fishing are allowed with proper permit, no roads or buildings are constructed and there is also no logging or mining, in compliance with the 1964 Wilderness Act. Wilderness areas within National Forests and Bureau of Land Management areas also allow hunting in season. There are many mountain lakes and sky scraping peaks located in the Cabinets, the highest of the peaks being Snowshoe Peak.
