= Hypebeast =

Hypebeast may refer to:

- Hypebeast culture, a contemporary youth culture focused on clothing styles
- Hypebeast (company), catering to hypebeast culture
