= Islamophobia in Poland =

Prejudice towards Islam or Muslims in Poland

Islamophobia in Poland is the fear, hatred of, or prejudice against the Islamic religion or Muslims in Poland. Since the Muslim community in Poland is small (0.1% of the population) the situation has been described as "Islamophobia without Muslims". According to Monika Bobako, Islamophobia is one of the main elements of the Polish nationalist discourse. Islamophobia in Poland takes the form of xenophobia and discrimination towards Muslims or those perceived as Muslim.

== Background and context ==
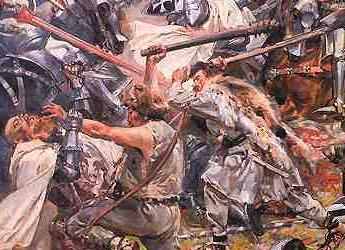
Polish Tatar soldiers in Battle of Grunwald painting

Prior to World War II, the vast majority of Poland's Muslim population was Tatar, who had been present in Poland since the 14th century. However the boundary changes of the war left most of the Tatars outside of Poland, and this led the Polish Muslim community to be increasingly diverse. According to a 2015 estimate, Muslims in Poland are estimated to number between 25,000 and 40,000 people or some 0.1% of the population, and are composed of some 5,000 Lipka Tatars as well as more numerous recent immigrants. During communist rule the censorship office barred unfavorable portrayals of Muslims due to Poland's geopolitical alignment with Arab countries during this period. After World War 2, the Muslim Religious Association grew leading to the eventual migration of Muslim Arab students to Poland during the 1970s and 80s. Today, most Muslim immigrants are arriving from Syria, Chechnya, Iraq, Tajikistan and Bangladesh.

Immigration of Poles to the United Kingdom has led many migrants from the homogeneous Polish society to encounter a culturally diverse setting for the first time. This contact, coupled with continued contact with family members in Poland, has led to a transnational transfer of Islamophobia back into Poland.

While Islamophobia existed previously in Poland, in connection to Polish casualties in the war on terror and mosque construction in 2010 and 2012, the 2015 European migrant crisis made Islamophobia a central issue. Many non-Muslim Poles associate Islam with violence and terrorism. In conjunction, xenophobic attitudes increased in Poland including antisemitism and Islamophobia. As of 2018 Poland exhibits one of the highest rates of Islamophobia in Europe.

== Polls ==
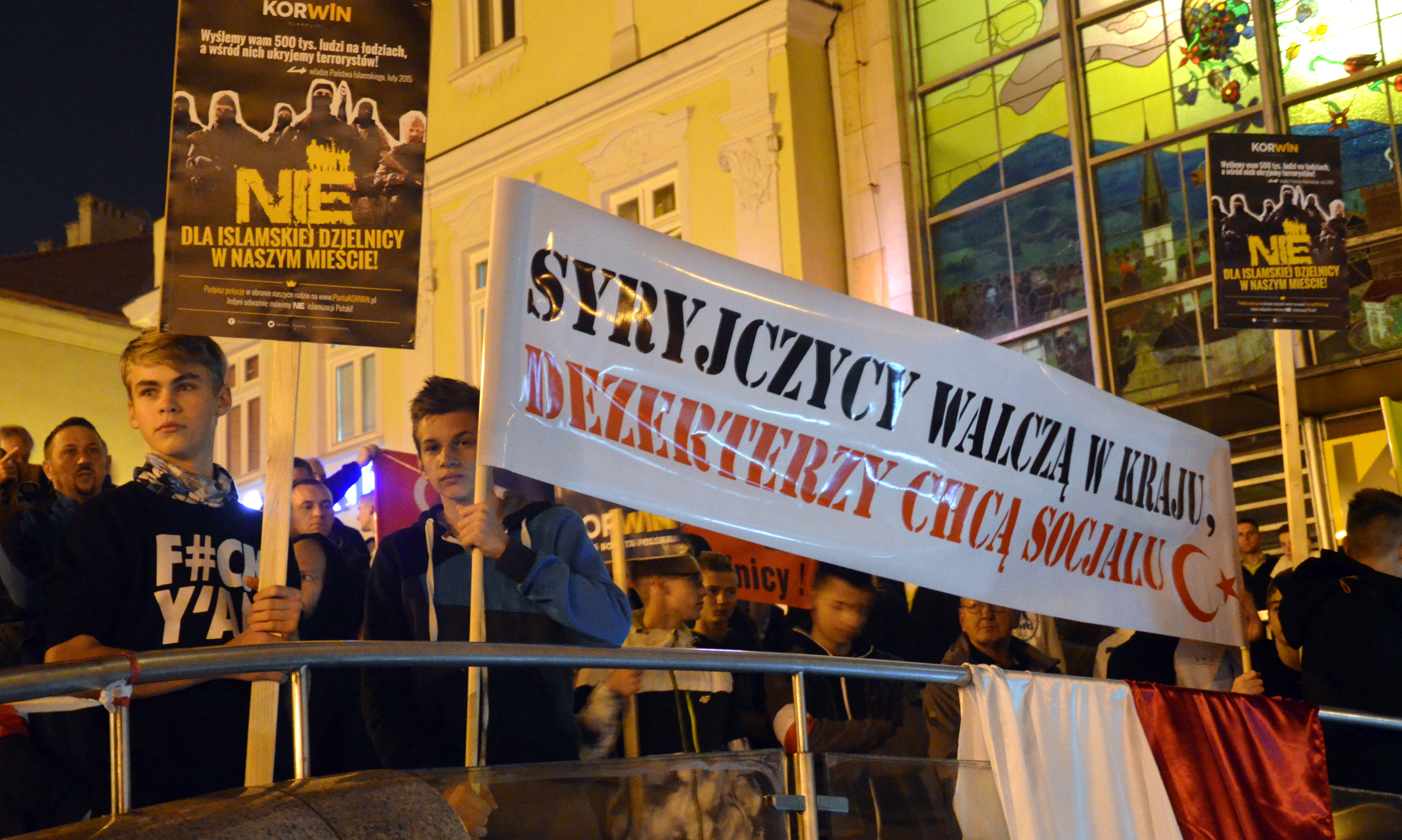
An anti-Islamic protest in Poland

According to a 2011 poll, 47% of Poles stated that "too many Muslims live in Poland", and 62% stated that "Islam is an intolerant religion", the highest rate of the eight countries surveyed in the poll. A 2017 poll of Polish secondary school pupils showed that the majority expressed strong homophobic, anti-refugee, and Islamophobic prejudice.

Between January and October 2017, 664 anti-Muslim hate crime proceedings were started in Poland, of which 193 proceeded to an indictment. Muslims were the most targeted group, and some 20% of all recorded hate crimes were directed at Muslims.

Whereas the normal age distribution of prejudice is tilted towards older people, the opposite is true in Poland: A 2015 opinion poll showed 59 percent of 18 to 24 years associated Islam with dangers contrasted with 37 percent of those older than 65. According to a 2016 poll, Poles significantly overestimate the size of the small Muslim community, believing that there are 2.6 million Muslims in Poland and that the Muslim population is expected to increase to 5 million (13 percent of the population) by 2020.

In a 2018 poll of Catholic seminary students, 75 percent said they had no contact with Muslims. On a negative/positive scale of +50 to -50, students placed Catholicism at 44, Orthodox Christianity at 23, Islam at -8.4, and Jehovah's Witnesses at -10.2. 80 percent responded that Islam encourages violence, a notion that extends to individual Muslims which 80 percent viewed as more aggressive than non-Muslims. Almost 80 percent of future priests indicated that Muslims mistreat women. Some 44 percent supported (partially or fully) the banning of Islam in Poland.

According to a 2016 study, many Poles incorrectly believe every Muslim is Arab and that vice versa every Arab is Muslim. 48% of Arab respondents said they experience racism in Poland and 26% said they were physically assaulted. Despite this hostility, Arab respondents think that while some Poles are racist, most are not.

== Mosques ==
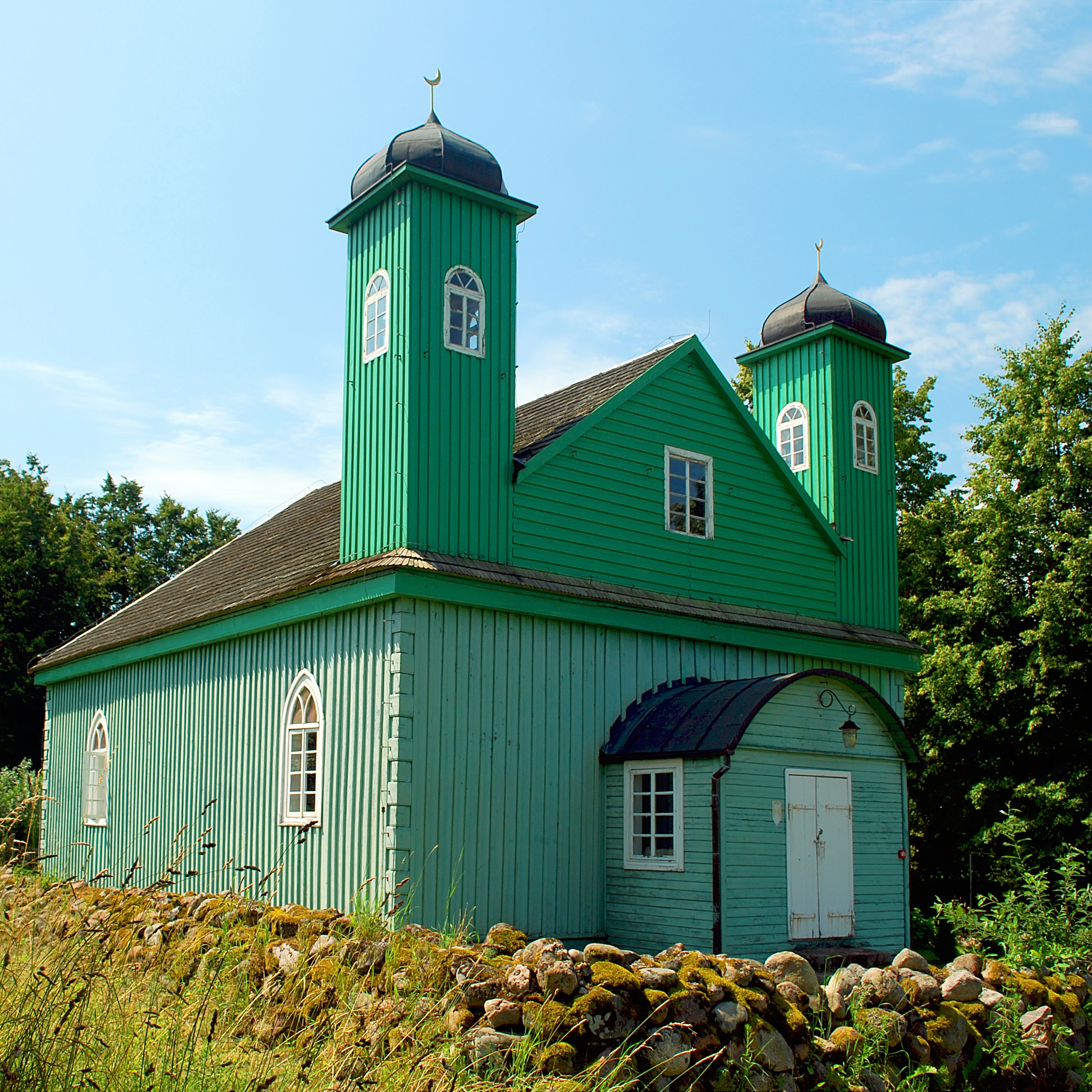
Historic wooden Kruszyniany Mosque, used by Lipka Tatar community, and targeted by an Islamophobic attack in 2014

In 2010 the Muslim League of Poland planned the first purpose-built mosque in Warsaw in the Ochota district. A group called Europe of the Future (Polish: Europa Przyszłości) organized protests against construction, framing their opposition in terms of "European values" of freedom of expression, secularism, democratic ideals, and women's rights. Prior to the protest, the group distributed posters resembling prior Swiss posters with a niqab clad woman and minarets resembling missiles.

In 2012, the Ahmadiyya community attempted to build a mosque in the Włochy district of Warsaw. Europa Przyszłości, who were the main opponents of the Ochota mosque, declared they would not protest as they viewed the Ahmadiyya community as peaceful. However, local councilors opposed the mosque construction, and most of the neighborhood signed a petition organized by Law and Justice councilors. The local council rejected the plan in 2013. While much of the opposition to the mosque employed spatial planning concerns, a subtext of resentment towards Muslims was evident in the debate as well as in the council's rejection letter which noted that "the construction of a culturally foreign object is a reason for concern regarding the loss of value of the estates in Włochy".

The Ochota mosque, the first in Warsaw, was finally opened before the Ramadan of 2015, a turning point in Polish Islamic history. However, the mosque had been faced with hostilities since construction, including an incident in which it was shot at and the tossing of a pig's head into the building after it opened. Furthermore, a wave of attacks against Polish mosques accompanied construction, including notably the drawing of a pig's head on the Kruszyniany Mosque of the Tatar community who had previously lived in Poland for hundreds of years without hostilities directed at them.

== Women ==
Traditionally Lipka Tatar women did not wear the hijab, making the visibility of Muslim women in Polish society a recent trend. Kasia Narkowicz and Konrad Pędziwiatr have stated in their co-authored paper that this visibility has made Muslim women targets of Islamophobia by two camps: right-wing Catholicism and a secular liberal camp. While these two camps share little in common value, the Islamophobic expression towards the bodies of Muslim women is shared, both camps stating that Muslim women face oppression.

In Polish Islamophobic discourse, veiled Muslim women are symbolized as threatening in conjunction with the narrative that the women themselves are oppressed. The gendered anti-Muslim narratives in Poland is a version of "gendered exceptionalism" similar to that prevalent in Western countries in which the patriarchy of the ingroup is minimized while the patriarchy of the outgroup is emphasized.

== Political parties ==
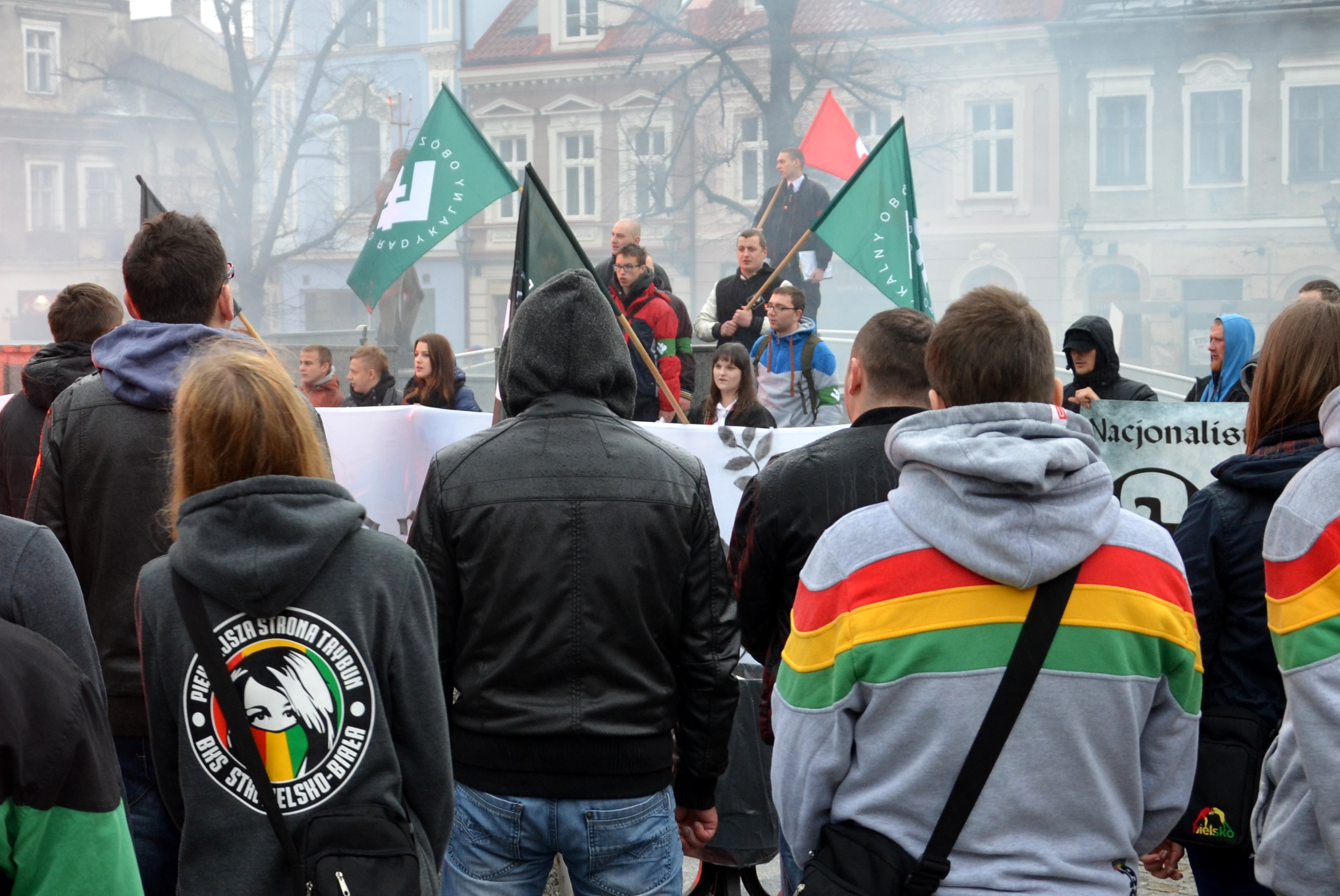
Protest against Islamic migration in Poland by the far right National Radical Camp

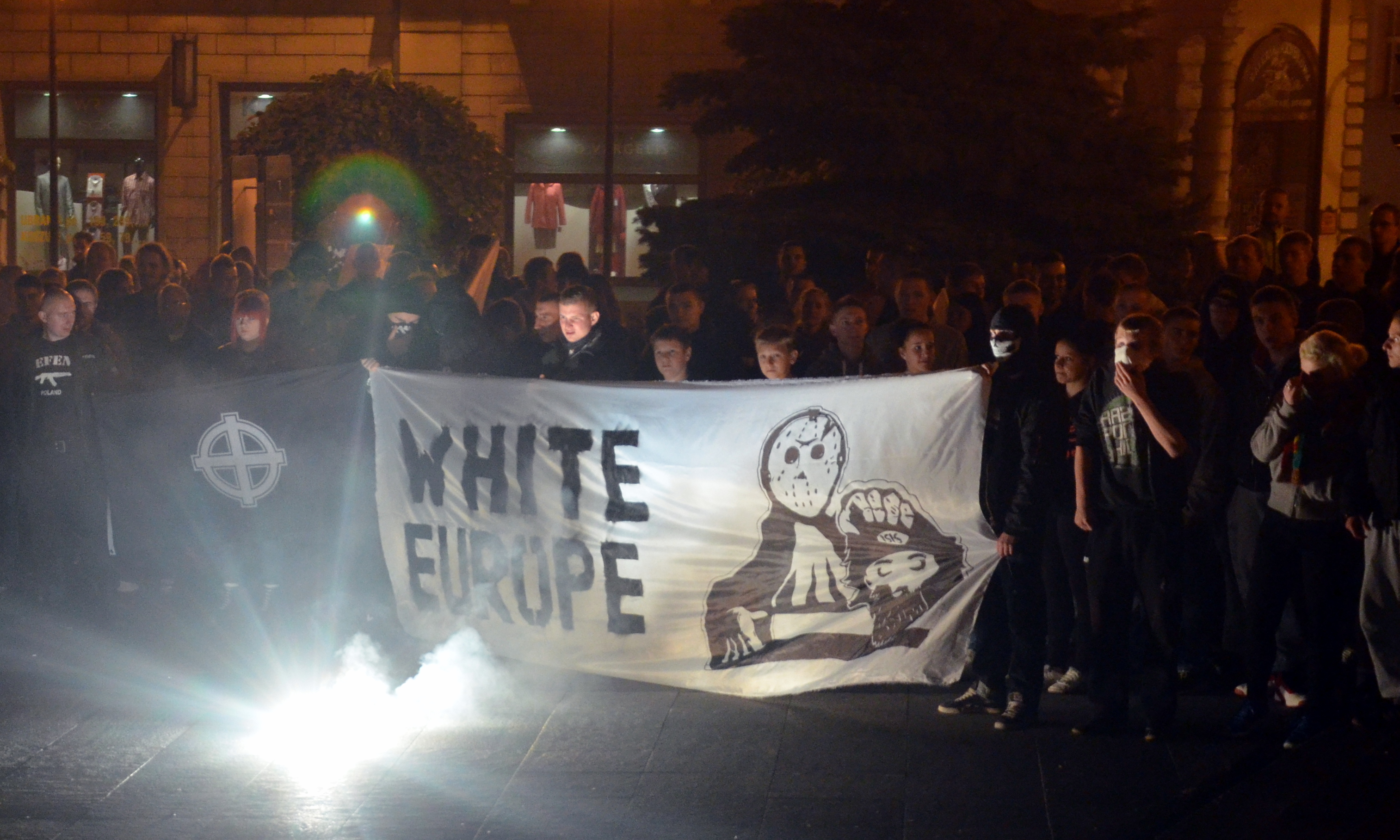
Anti-Islam protest in Poland

=== Law and Justice ===
Following the European migration crisis, migration has become a central issue in Polish politics. The Law and Justice (PiS) party has adopted the discourse typical of the far-right in Europe. PiS has linked national security with migration, and connected refugees with Muslims. In their statements, PiS politicians used falsified data and differentiated between refugees and so called economic migrants which had wholly negative connotations. Following the 2015 Polish parliamentary election, PiS cemented control of public media and utilized Islamophobic rhetoric to rally its supporters. The mainstreaming of Islamophobic discourse may lend legitimacy to physical violence versus the "racialized Other".

=== Extreme right ===
While in other countries, such as the Czech Republic, there have been positive relations between the extreme right and Islamism, in Poland this is rare. In the 2006, League of Polish Families's MP Wojciech Wierzejski wrote a blog entry titled "Resistance to Islam" which was criticized by the Helsinki Foundation for Human Rights. In 2007 a branch of Stop Islamisation of Europe was established in Poland, and from 2010 the conservative Europe of the Future led by Jan Wójcik and the Euroislam.pl portal led by Piotr Slusarczyk have become vocal.

Islamophobic groups like the "Polish Defense League" were formed to defend Polish honor and prevent Polish women from being seduced by Muslim men.

During 2015 elections, the KORWiN party ran an openly racist advertisement titled "The invasion has started" showing aggressive dark-skinned men coupled with derogatory statements and world map in which white marked parts succumbed to a black invasion.

== Media ==
On public television, guests have spoken of Muslims as "uncivilized" and a threat to "European and Christian values" and have described them as "violent": as "Jihadists", "terrorists", and "rapists". Piela and Łukjanowicz contend that guests they say engage in anti-Muslim rhetoric—Miriam Shaded (director of the Estera Foundation), Tomasz Terlikowski, Wojciech Cejrowski, Marcin Rola, Witold Gadwoski and Dariusz Oko—are "handpicked" by the networks. One evening program on TVP—After Eight—has hosted guests overtly hostile to Islam, one of whom referred to the Qur'an as a Satanic book "about hatred and intolerance" in contrast to the Bible, which the guest called "a book about love". While the moderate wing of the Catholic Church has espoused tolerance, the opinions of those closer to the conservative wing of the Church, expressed in Fronda.pl and Polonia Christiana (PCh24.pl), have been significant in their contribution to the stereotyping of refugees and Muslims.

In 2016, the right-wing wSieci magazine ran a cover with a white women assaulted by dark males under the title "The Islamic rape of Europe" which evoked outrage, and has been compared to WWII propaganda with the same imagery.

According to Jaskulowski, the more liberal Polish media (Polityka and Gazeta Wyborcza) opposed the right-wing discourse of fear and focused in some instances on the human aspect of the immigration story, but have also spoken of a "flood" and a "wave".

== Role of the Catholic Church ==
While Pope Francis has called for Catholic communities to aid refugees, this call has not been well received in Poland. Some Polish bishops have questioned the papal call, and some younger priests have taken an active role in anti-Muslim and anti-refugee protests. This has contributed to Islamophobia moving from the fringes to mainstream discourse in Poland.

Whereas in other Western countries Islamophobia has been linked with concerns of public displays of faith by Muslims, in Poland it has been connected to the Catholic church and the notion of European re-Christianization. The othering of Muslims is used to rally the faithful around "Christian" values in order to halt the imagined "conquest of Europe" by Islam.

One of the key targets of Catholic Islamophobic narratives is Muslim women. Within this narrative, Muslim women are seen as reproducers of the faith, a message that fits within the Church's emphasis on reproductive politics.

The Polish Catholic church is composed of two camps: authoritarian, nationalist, traditionalist Catholicism and open post-conciliar Catholicism. While the leaders of the Church expressed themselves in the discourse of the open church, they also evoked the terrorist threat of the religious other. Furthermore, the church leaders endorsed a "help them where they are" (in refugee camps outside Poland) approach towards refugees, which was adopted by the ruling PiS party. A small group, connected to the liberal and Tygodnik Powszechny and Więź publications, expressed true open church sentiments criticizing the restrained approach of the Church hierarchy and the anti-refugee bishops. The opposing traditionalist bishop criticized the Church hierarchy as well, and expressed Islamophobic clichés. Archbishop Henryk Hoser stated that jihadists controlled the migration and that communities of refugees would be a "perfect breeding ground for the recruitment of fanatics".

== Incidents ==
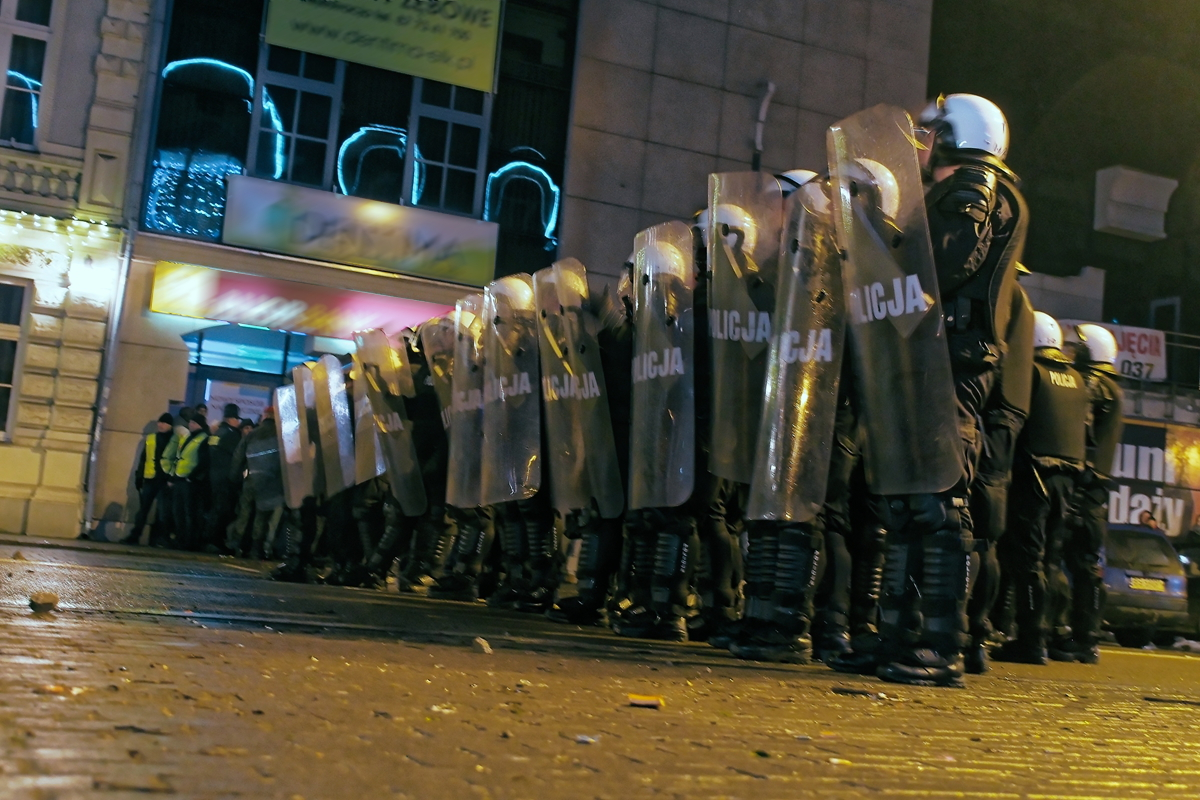
Riot police, center of Ełk, during 2017 Ełk riots

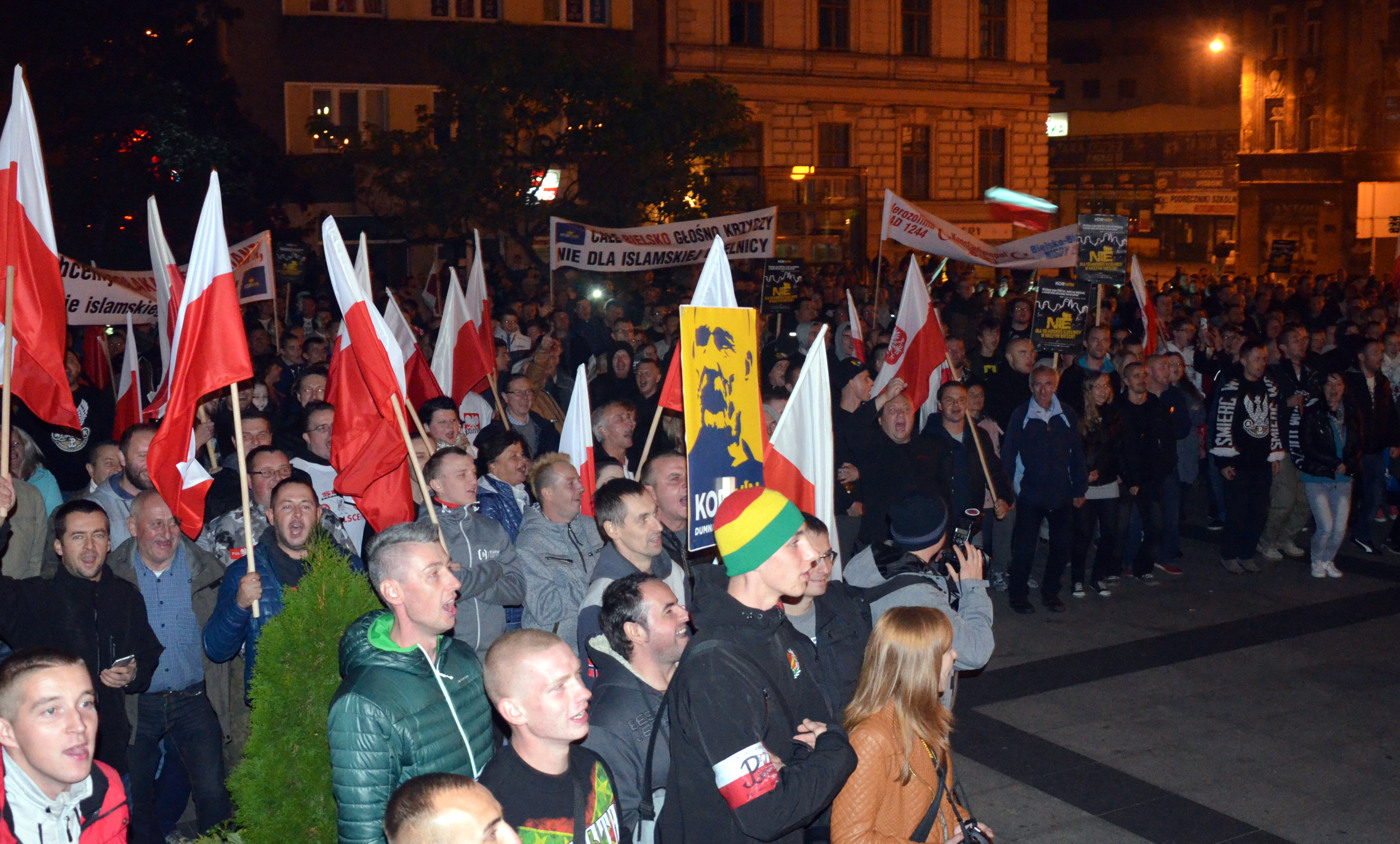
Anti-Islam rally in Poland in 2015

In 2013, the Jewish and Tatar communities in Poland jointly protested a halal and kosher slaughter ban.

According to the anti-racist organization "Never Again", the "biggest wave of hatred" in recent history took place during the Polish elections of 2015 when significant street protests against other ethnic and religious groups took place, focusing on Muslim refugees.

The January Ełk riots occurred after a thief was killed by a local Kebab shop employee of Moroccan origin. Several hundred men surrounded the Prince Kebab restaurant, chanting racist, anti-immigrant and Islamophobic slogans, and tossing firecrackers, stones, and Molotov cocktails at the shop. Police initially stood by and did not intervene for several hours, however when they did intervene the crowd turned against them as well. Other attacks on Kebab restaurants took place throughout Poland.

In November 2017 on Polish Independence Day, marchers in a 60,000 strong nationalist march in Poland expressed antisemitic and Islamophobic sentiments. Jarosław Kaczyński, leader of the governing PiS, described the incidents as "marginal", saying the marchers may have been baited. According to the American Jewish Committee the march was "seriously marred by hateful, far-right throngs that threaten the core values of Poland and its standing abroad". Prior to the march, called a "great march of patriots" by state TV, government-controlled media in Poland disseminated accounts of alleged Muslim criminal activity.

Later in November 2017, amidst a rise in xenophobic incidents, two hooded men smashed a dozen windows in the Muslim cultural centre in Warsaw.

In 2019, Polish president Andrzej Duda awarded the Grand Cross of the Order of Merit of the Republic of Poland to Roger Scruton who had previously been dismissed from his UK government role following comments on Jews and Islamophobia. Scruton had said that Islamophobia had been "invented by the Muslim Brotherhood in order to stop discussion of a major issue".

In January 2021, two men in Warsaw were charged for planning to bomb a mosque. Explosives and firearms were found at the premises belonging to the two men. The men's motives were to "prevent the Islamization of Poland" and to "exterminate" Muslims.
