= Chronovski =

Watch brand

Chronovski was formed in Singapore in 2003 to create cheap crystal watches.

At that time, the watch market was dominated by bling culture, facilitated by 3 trends.

1. The hip-hop culture led by rapstars such as Beyoncé, Eminem and Jay-Z.
2. The rightist/conservative movement towards bling culture where consumers styled themselves like monarchs decked in diamonds.
3. A mass market movement to diamond watches as a way to portray affluence.

Chronovski proceeded to launch sub $100–200 crystal encrusted watches. Chronovski watches often came with flashy and glittery designs.

In the years 2004 to 2010, Chronovski managed to distribute half a million pieces of watches. Norway was the largest market, followed by USA, Sweden, Denmark, UK and Australia.

2008's Lehman Bros collapse decimated the bling-bling trend. What was seen as opulent excesses of Wall Street was frowned upon and the fashion trend shifted away from bling culture.

Most importantly, the rise of smartphones and its replacement of watches as time-keeping devices hit Chronovski badly in the early 2010s.

In 2012, watch-making came to an end for the company when Chronovski diversified into a digital lifestyle fashion brand.
