= Chedid =

Chedid is a surname. Notable people with the surname include:

- Andrée Chedid (1920–2011), Egyptian-born French poet and novelist of Lebanese extraction
- Henri Chedid (born 1934), Lebanese politician and businessman
- Jihane Almira Chedid (born 2000), Indonesian actress, model, beauty pageant titleholder
- John George Chedid (1923–2012), Maronite Bishop of the Maronite Catholic Eparchy of Our Lady of Lebanon of Los Angeles
- Louis Chedid (born 1948), French singer-songwriter, son of Andrée Chedid
- Matthieu Chedid (born 1971), French rock singer-songwriter and guitar player, son of Louis Chedid and grandson of Andrée Chedid

== See also ==
- Estádio Nabi Abi Chedid, football (soccer) stadium in Bragança Paulista, São Paulo state, Brazil
- Miriam Shaded (born 1986), Polish entrepreneur, human rights activist and critic of Islam
