= Streetwear =

Style of casual clothing

Streetwear is a style of casual clothing that gained global popularity in the 1990s. Emerging from African-American culture in New York, it evolved to incorporate elements of sportswear, punk, Californian surf culture, skateboarding, 1980s nostalgia, and Japanese street fashion. Streetwear is seen as an aspect of African American culture and fashion, and is associated with African American musical traditions, particularly RnB and hip-hop.

Streetwear is commonly linked to exclusivity, as many brands limit production through artificial scarcity to drive demand. This has led to practices such as limited edition releases and resale markets. In the 21st century, streetwear intersected with haute couture, as luxury fashion houses adopted streetwear influences, while streetwear brands incorporated aspects of high fashion including runway presentation, designer collaborations, and premium branding.

== History ==
Streetwear has been defined in many different ways, such as: a movement of widespread references from American culture in the 1990s and skater culture, as hip-hop fashion from the East Coast, as a distinct style within African American culture, or as a generalized synonym for any locale's street fashion.

Streetwear style is generally accepted to have been born out of the emerging hip-hop culture of the late 1970s and early 1980s in New York City, consisting predominately of African Americans; it then migrated to the West Coast and incorporated elements of Los Angeles surf culture and skate culture. Early streetwear in the 1970s and 1980s also took inspiration from the do-it-yourself aesthetic of punk, new wave, heavy metal.

== Surf Culture ==
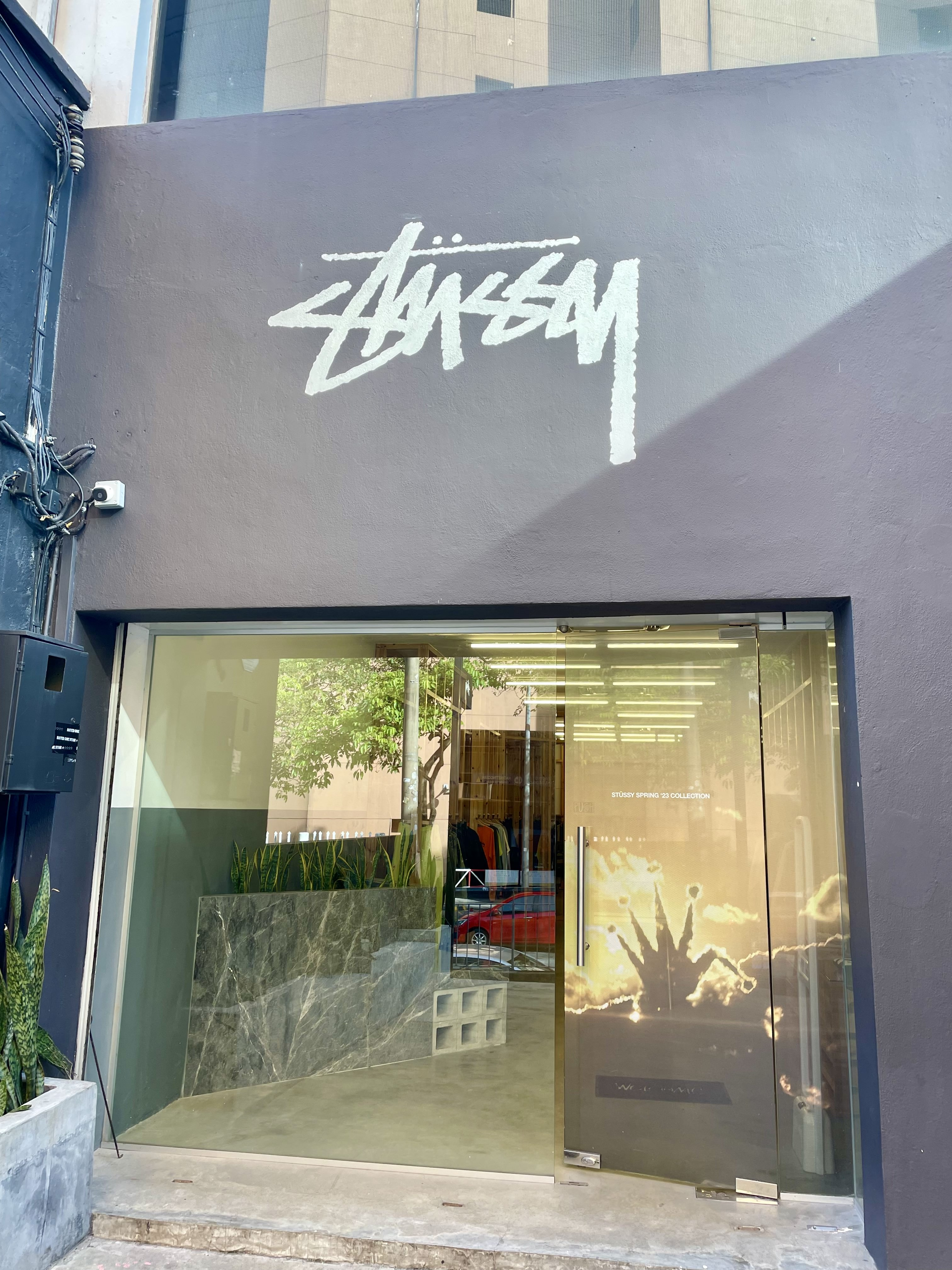
A Stüssy store in Kuala Lumpur

In the 1980s. Surfboard designer Shawn Stussy began selling printed T-shirts featuring the same trademark signature he placed on his custom surfboards. Initially selling the items from his own car, Stussy expanded sales to boutiques once his popularity increased. Then as sales peaked, Stüssy moved into exclusive sales to create product scarcity, which established streetwear's focus on T-shirts and exclusivity; Stüssy remains one of the most popular streetwear brands.

== African American culture ==
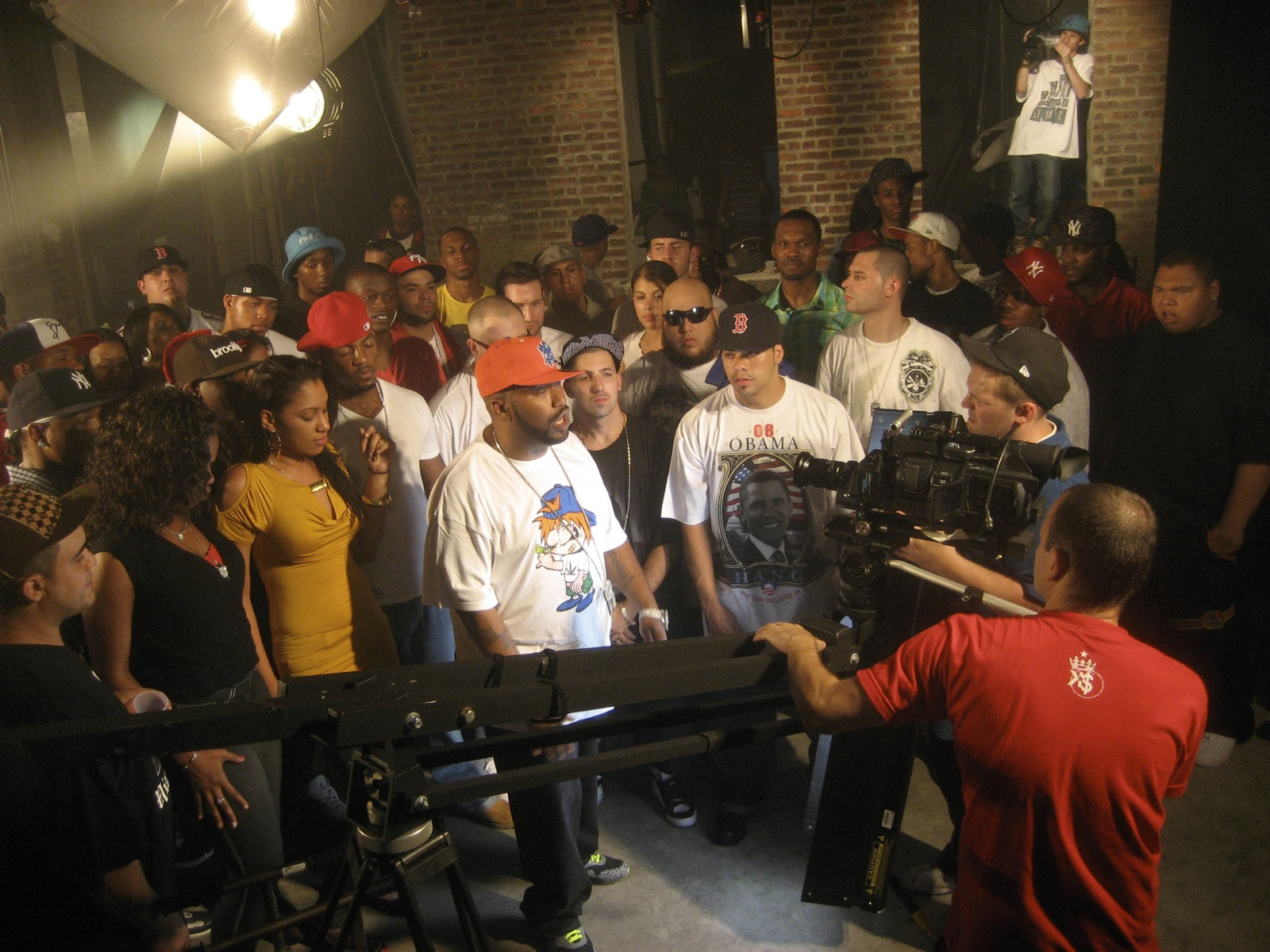
A crowd in streetwear

Streetwear originated predominantly African American communities in the 1970s and 1980s in New York City's emerging hip-hop scene. It often drew from established legacy sportswear and workwear fashion brands such as Schott NYC, Dr. Martens, Kangol, Fila and Adidas. The culture around streetwear has been described as a lifestyle "expressed through art, music, and apparel".

During the 1980s, designer Dapper Dan (Daniel R. Day) in Harlem, New York, created early streetwear aesthetics. Dapper Dan has been considered the original creator of streetwear fashion. Working from his made-to-order customization boutique opened in 1982, Day combined luxury branding with custom designs influenced by experiences in Africa, helping popularize logo-centered and individualized fashion that diverged from mainstream norms.

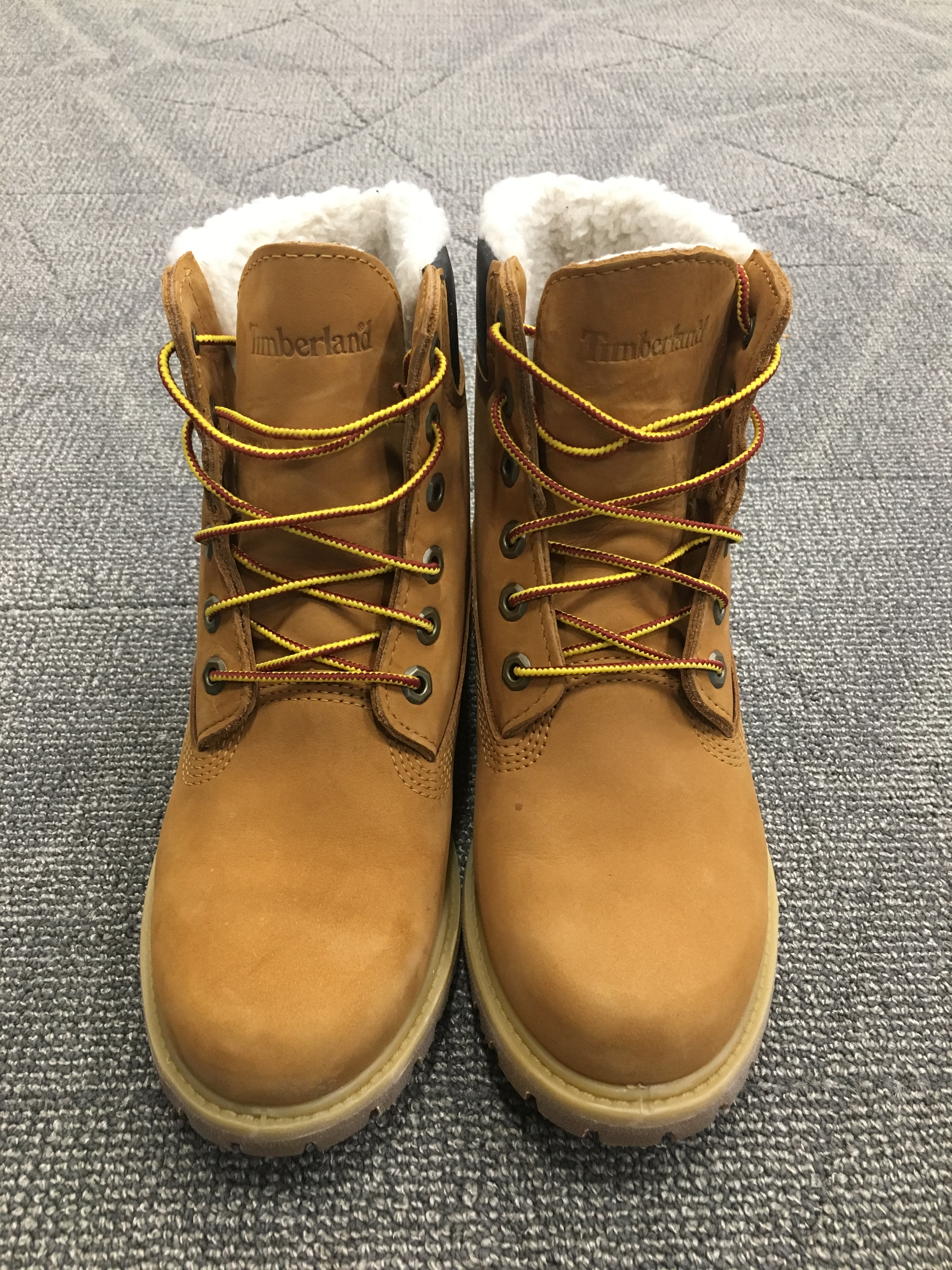
Timberland boots are an everyday shoe in streetwear.

In the early 1990s, burgeoning record labels associated with popular hip-hop acts like Tommy Boy Records, Def Jam Recordings, and Delicious Vinyl began selling branded merchandise embroidered onto letterman and workwear jackets made by companies like Carhartt. By mid-decade, influences included skateboarding and gangsta rap. Professional American sports franchises have had a significant impact on the scene, especially the New York Yankees, Los Angeles Raiders and Chicago Bulls caps and jackets, with their production of oversized team jerseys, as well as boots from The Timberland Company and the latest shoe design releases from Nike, Inc. Brand launches by the chief executives of record companies followed, with Russell Simmons of Def Jam launching his Phat Farm label, Sean Combs of Bad Boy with Sean John, and Jay-Z and Damon Dash of Roc-a-Fella Records launching Rocawear.`

Streetwear has also been used in the African-American community as an art-form to expression ideas and criticisms about society, such as about gender dynamics and expression. Throughout the decades, African American streetwear has been known to include styles and pieces such as: baggy or oversized jeans, pants, hoodies, t-shirts, and jackets; graphic t-shirts; bucket hats, often Kangol brand; tracksuits; grillz; sneakers; and aesthetics from Bling-bling and hip-hop fashion such as gold chains and other jewelry. Before it was labeled as "streetwear", black street fashion was called "urban wear" by fashion houses.

Bling-bling culture began in African American communities in the 1990s, followed by the adoption of Streetwear into Haute Couture within the decade. Virgil Abloh, a Ghanaian American luxury fashion designer, was known for his impact on streetwear's global popularization. Abloh often centered Black and African culture in his designs.

=== Sneakerheads ===
Sneaker collecting was popularized in-part by African Americans and is an important aspect of contemporary African American culture. Sneakers have been associated with streetwear since the late 1970s. By the late 1980s, sneaker collecting had become an established part of the subculture, driven in part by the popularity of Air Jordans, the signature line of basketball player Michael Jordan. Another influential model was the Nike Air Force 1, which gained prominence in the hip-hop, trap, and UK grime scenes.

Although preferred styles have shifted over time, sneakers remain a central element of streetwear. Collecting and resale practices continue to link sneaker culture closely with streetwear and hypebeast communities. Aiming for sneakerheads in African American culture, mass marketing for sneakers in the United States has often targeted African Americans.

== Global streetwear ==
Streetwear now enjoys globally popularity and is regularly associated with luxury brands. Jil Sander was the earliest luxury fashion brand to collaborate with a sportswear firm, Adidas, on a co-creation project in 1998. Since the advent of "bling" culture, there has been established luxury brands making inroads into the market, with Burberry, Gucci and Fendi making appearances in films and hip-hop videos. Singer Pharrell Williams collaborated with Nigo, fashion designer and A Bathing Ape creator, to create Billionaire Boys Club, is credited with mixing Japanese street fashion and streetwear and increasing their visibility in high fashion. Fashion clothing manufacturers began to follow the streetwear companies, co-opting the idea of very-limited-edition capsule collections, known as "drops", using social media and product scarcity as marketing tools.

In the 2010s, some streetwear brands were coveted as much as the most historically elite fashion brands. Japanese streetwear brands such as A Bathing Ape (BAPE) and Neighborhood played an important role in the global spread of streetwear. Complex Magazine named Stüssy, Supreme, and A Bathing Ape as the top streetwear brands, and many went on to collaborate on prized high-fashion capsule collections such as Supreme x Louis Vuitton, Fila x Fendi, A Bathing Ape x Comme des Garcons, and Stüssy x Dior.

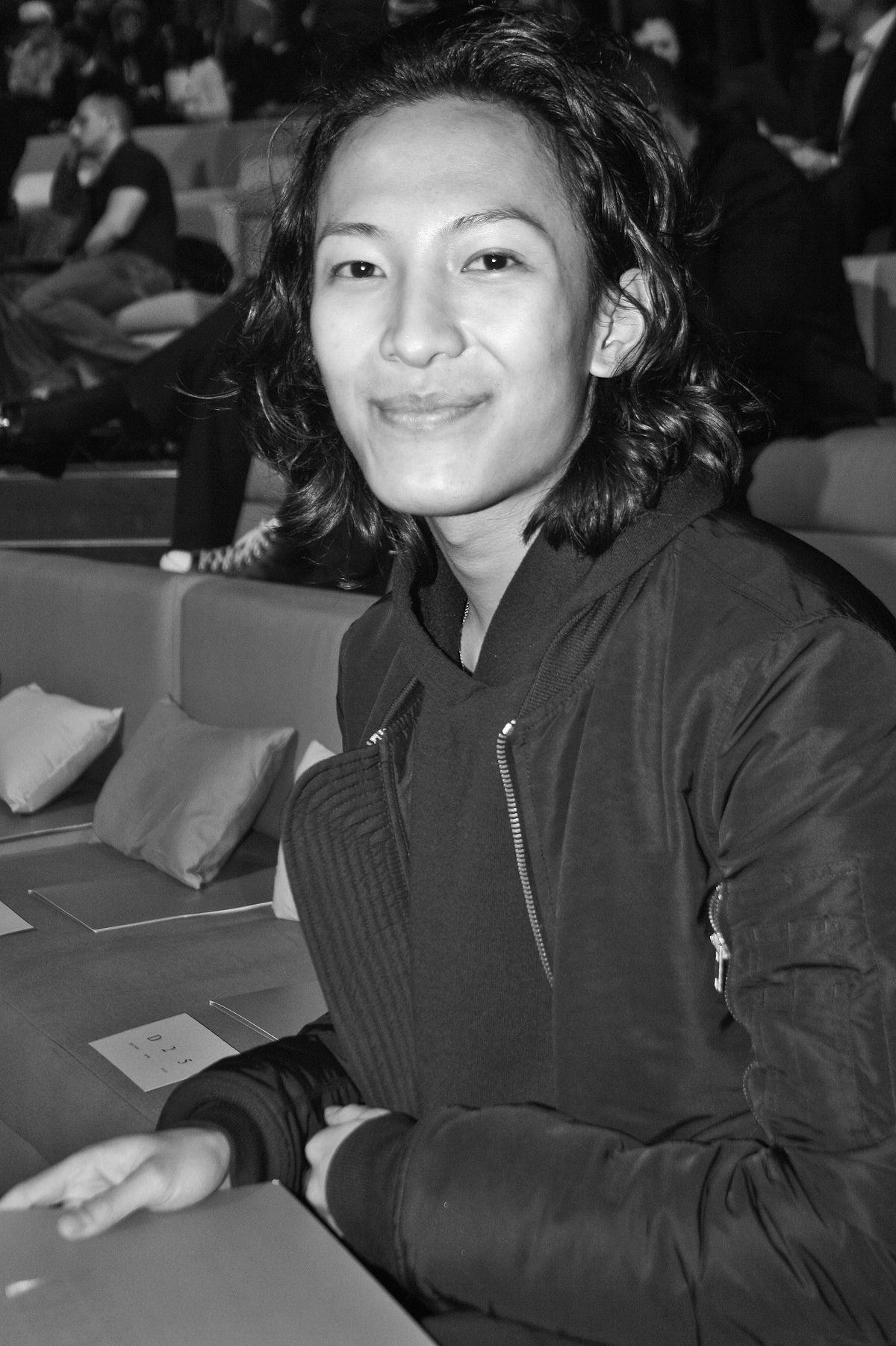
Alexander Wang developed "luxury sportswear" in his eponymous brand.

Contemporary streetwear has an increasing influence on haute couture and has itself been influenced by runway shows. Designers such as Virgil Abloh and Raf Simons have affected the evolution of streetwear through their influence on hip-hop and popular culture. Other designers such as Demna Gvasalia, creative director of Vetements and Balenciaga, championed trends such as the chunky sneaker and oversized hoodie. Moreover, the global sneaker market was valued at approximately $85 billion (USD) in 2022 and is projected to reach $120 billion (USD) by 2026.

=== Hypebeast culture ===
The term "hypebeast" originated in the mid-2000s as a AAVE term for individuals who bought streetwear primarily to follow trends. Initially used as a derogatory term, it was later reappropriated by Hong Kong journalist Kevin Ma, who named his fashion blog Hypebeast after the phrase.

While the website grew into a global media platform, the term retained negative associations in some regions. In the United States, it was linked to a lack of authenticity and trend-chasing, while in the United Kingdom it became a pejorative for consumers who imitated celebrity styles, particularly those of mainstream hip-hop artists. Over time, some adopted the label as a self-identifier, using it in an ironic or affectionate sense, similar to the evolution of otaku in Japanese culture.

Hypebeast culture is often associated with logo-heavy clothing and the practice of purchasing multiple designer items to display wealth and trend awareness. It is closely connected to sneaker collecting and resale markets, where limited release shoes are bought for the purpose of reselling at higher prices. This practice has been criticized for prioritizing financial gain and prestige over cultural or stylistic significance.

== Cultural Appropriation ==
Since streetwear is heavily associated with African American culture and has its origins in hip-hop, it has become subject of cultural appropriation claims. Aspects of Black American culture are often subjected to being popularized outside of their culture context, include AAVE, streetwear, and Black music. Streetwear's transformation into a haute couture global phenomenon has also been criticized as cultural appropriation. Moreover, the appropriation of sneaker culture outside of the African American community has also been seen as cultural appropriation and commodification. This is, in part, because streetwear and "urban wear" were originally marginalized by the fashion community, before being accepted, marketed, and sold to a global audience.

A 2025 study of young Americans at the undergraduate university level demonstrated that, while many participated in streetwear fashion, few knew its cultural roots.

== See also ==
- Athleisure
- Gorpcore
- Ready-to-wear
- Street style
- Luxury Workwear brands:
  - Carhartt WIP
  - R.M.Williams
