= Ełk riots =

2017 anti-Muslim riots in Ełk, Poland

Ełk Riots
- Date: 1 January 2017
- Location: Ełk, Poland
- Caused by: Murder of a Polish man by a Tunisian shopowner.
- Methods: Rioting, Demonstrations, Vandalism, Attempted Arson

Parties
Polish rioters: Right-wing political organizations; Other White rioters	Ełk Police Muslim residents

Number
300	

Casualties
- Arrested: 28

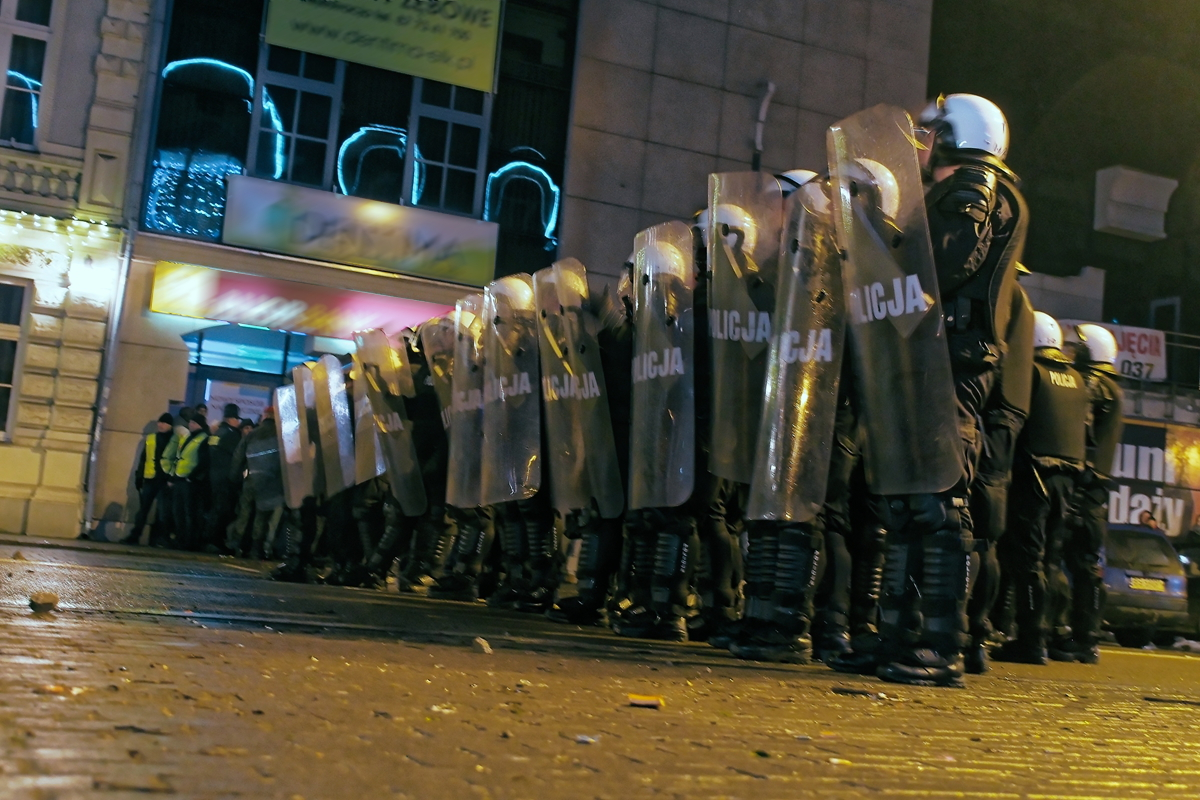
Riot police, center of Ełk, 1 January 2017

The anti-Muslim Ełk riots occurred on 1 January 2017 in the town of Ełk, Poland, after 21-year-old Daniel Rudnicki stole two Coca-Cola bottles from a local kebab shop and was murdered by the establishment's cook (a Tunisian immigrant with Polish citizenship) who chased him with a knife. The fatal stabbing sparked riots the next day. Angry young locals chanted anti-foreigner slogans, smashed Prince Kebab's window, and threw rocks, bottles, and at least one firecracker at the restaurant. Police responded using pepper spray and arrested 28 people.

== Background ==
In 2017, the town of Ełk had some 61,500 residents, 6 of which were originally from Muslim-majority countries who were owners or employees of four kebab shops in the town. An anti-immigrant demonstration took place in Ełk, followed by a protest against a refugee center in the nearby town of Olecko, and a racist assault against the Cleopatra Kebab immigrant workers in Ełk.

On 31 December 2016, a man named Daniel Rudnicki, entered the Prince Kebab shop, took two Coke bottles, and behaving ostentatiously left without paying while an associate launched a firecracker into the shop. Two immigrant restaurant workers, a cook, and the owner then chased the thief, one of them holding a kitchen knife. In the ensuing fight, the unarmed Rudnicki received lethal stab wounds and died soon after.

The significant impact on the media popularity of the events in Ełk was a December 19, 2016 terrorist attack in Berlin, for which the Islamic State took responsibility. Polish truck driver Łukasz Urban died in the attack. In the circumstances of the global threat of Muslim terrorism, local events in Ełk, although they had nothing to do with it, became extraordinarily current and momentous for the media.

== Riots ==
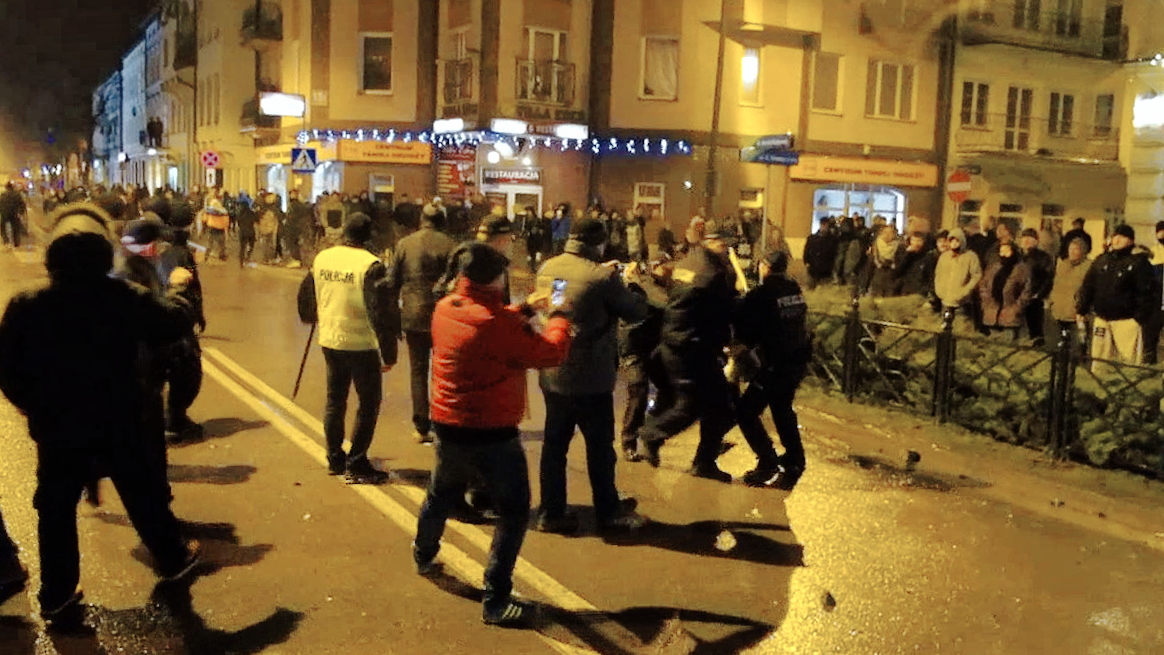
Center of Ełk, 1 January 2017

Following the altercation, 300 people surrounded the kebab bar. Initial media reports stated that Rudnicki was a random victim and not a thief chased by shop workers. Dozens of angry locals outraged by the murder, chanted anti-foreigner slogans, smashed Prince Kebab's window and at least one firecracker, rocks, bottles and paving stones were thrown at the restaurant. The police used pepper spray and arrested 28 people. The day following the riots, activists from the far-right National Radical Camp (ONR) came to Ełk, employing the slogan "Ełk free from jihad". Smaller incidents also took place in several other municipalities.

== Analysis ==
According to Anna Zawadzka, the Polish media often avoided describing the event as racist or Islamophobic and stressed the Polish identity of Rudnicki, while describing the shop workers as Algerian, Tunisian, or Arab.

Sociologists Michał Łyszczarz and Stefan M. Marcinkiewicz note that other fatal incidents involving foreigners, the killing of a Pole by two Canadians in Brożec in Lower Silesia on New Year's Eve or a drunk Ukrainian driver killing two teenagers in Jelenia Góra, did not elicit a similar response. Łyszczarz and Marcinkiewicz state that Ukrainians and Canadians were not the subject of attention as people from Muslim-majority countries were and did undergo a long-term process of spreading prejudices in public. Łyszczarz and Marcinkiewicz compare the death of Rudnicki to a spark in a powder keg which led to an outburst of stored emotions. In social media, which rapidly mobilized supporters, Rudnicki's death was referred to as a "jihad" and some local politicians utilized the events for self-promotion.

== Aftermath ==
The Polish interior minister Mariusz Błaszczak responded to events saying "Poland is not affected by social problems such as those in Western Europe, where big enclaves of Muslim immigrants who do not integrate with the rest of society occur". Błaszczak further stated that the riot was an expression of "utterly understandable fears" of Islamic terrorism in Europe.

Perception of Rudnicki varies among locals; While some see him as a man with a criminal record who died prior to the kebab violence, right-wing nationalists see him as the victim of "Arab" violence, part of a campaign of "Islamization of Europe". In Ełk, employees of a municipal kindergarten invited the anti-racist "Never Again" Association to hold tolerance lessons.

The man who stabbed Rudnicki, pleaded not guilty to the charge of murder, saying he did not want to kill anyone and that he is sorry for Rudnicki's family. According to TVN24, he was convicted of murder in 2019 and sentenced to 12 years in jail and a 70,000 Polish złoty fine. According to TVN24, the owner of Prince Kebab was sentenced to a suspended sentence of one year in prison for participating in the fight and not helping Rudnicki.

Some of the rioters were sentenced to prison or community service.
