= Kevin Ma =

Hong Kong-Canadian businessman

- Born: Ma Pak Wing; Hong Kong
- Education: University of British Columbia
- Known for: Hypebeast

Kevin Ma (Chinese: Ma Pak Wing 馬柏榮) is a Hong Kong-Canadian businessman who is best known for starting Hypebeast, a Hong Kong listed company that focuses on contemporary culture.

== Early life ==
Kevin Ma was born in Hong Kong in 1982. He spent most of his youth in Vancouver, Canada and also attended university there.

Ma attended the University of British Columbia for his undergraduate studies. In 2005, he graduated with a B.A. degree in Economics and Psychology.

== Career ==
In 2005, Ma started Hypebeast from his home in Vancouver, Canada as a sneaker blog on Blogger as part of his interest in street culture and streetwear. Ma got the inspiration for his website from people and communities around the world, and he would take this inspiration and spread them onto his website. At the time, he was a student majoring in economics and psychology, and also briefly worked in banking. The site quickly became popular among street culture enthusiasts.

As Hypebeast grew, Ma moved to Hong Kong and expanded it to include different aspects of street and contemporary culture, including fashion, art, music, design, and culture.

Ma published the first issue of Hypebeast Magazine in June 2012. Eventually, Hypebeast became a publicly listed company on the HKEX. Ma continues to lead Hypebeast Ltd. as of 2022.

Ma is known for popularizing the term hypebeast, which used to refer to a "sneakerhead" subculture associated with streetwear; however, according to Ma, "it can be anything nowadays." Over the years, the word has had increasingly positive connotations for people interested in contemporary clothing and culture.

== Recognition ==
- BoF 500
- 2019–2022 panel judge at LVMH Awards
