= Bling-bling =

Flashy, ostentatious or elaborate jewelry and ornamented accessories

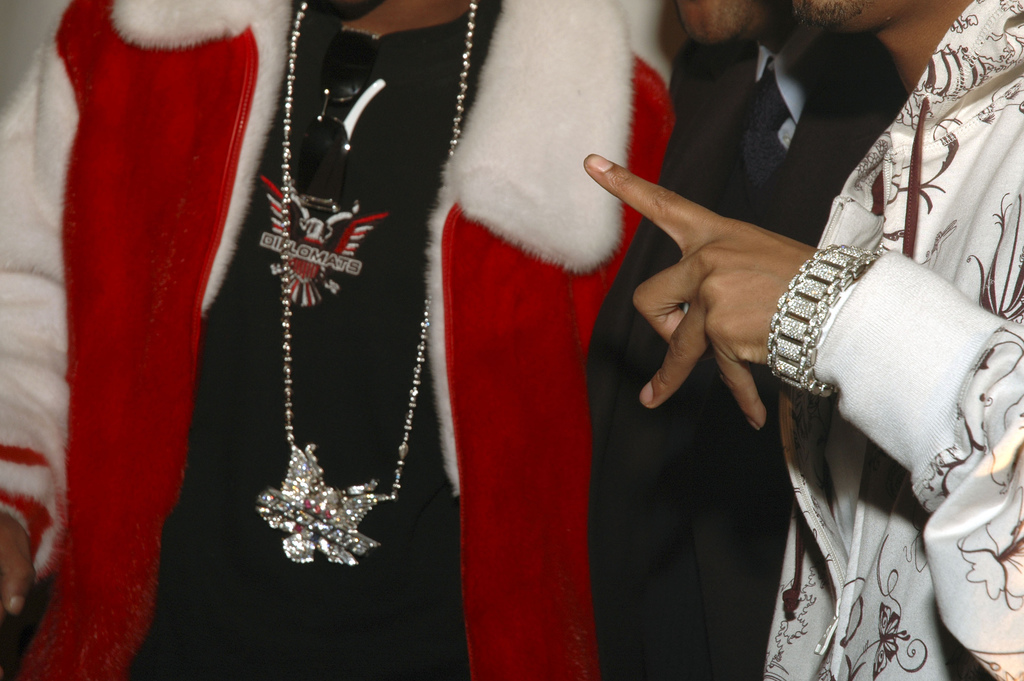
Bling-bling jewelry

Bling-bling, often shortened to just bling, is flashy jewelry and possessions displayed prominently to indicate wealth. The term arose in African American English before becoming general slang, ultimately growing into a cultural mainstay. Prominent examples of bling-bling include a large cross necklace or Jesus piece.

== Origins and popularization of the term ==
In linguistics terms, bling is either an ideophone or an onomatopoeia, depending on the definition one uses, with bling-bling being its reduplication. Some have attributed the term to rappers that came before B.G., or to the old cartoonish sound effects meant to convey the desirability and or shininess of gold, gems, jewels, money, and more.

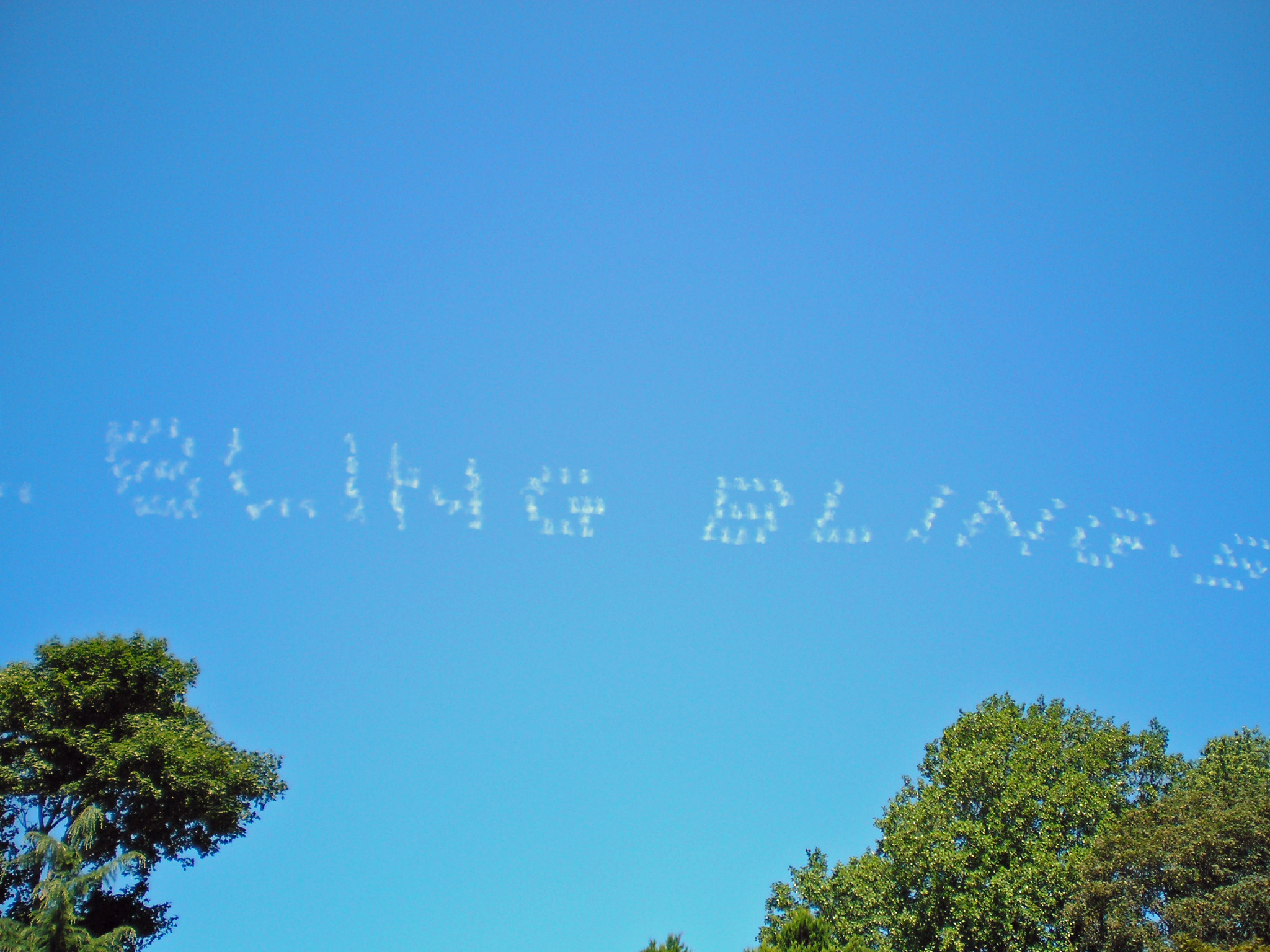
Use of the phrase has grown in popularity, as demonstrated by this skywriting advertisement over a summer resort destination in Southampton, New York, in 2006.

Bling became increasingly entrenched within the hip hop movement following B.G.'s release of his lead single "Bling Bling" off of his 1999 album Chopper City in the Ghetto.

=== Mass usage ===
The word was added to the Shorter Oxford English Dictionary in 2002, and to the Merriam Webster dictionary in 2006. Companies such as Sprint and Cadillac have used the word bling in their advertisements, for instance. On the other hand, in 2004, MTV released a satirical cartoon showing the term first being used by a rapper, followed by several progressively less "streetwise" characters, concluding with a middle-aged white woman describing her "bling" to her elderly mother.

The term was subsequently used for anyone displaying a luxurious and ostentatious lifestyle.

== In other languages ==
The term has spread to Spanish speaking countries around the world, with Latin hip-hop and reggaeton artists from places like Puerto Rico and Panama. The main nuance is that, in Spanish, it is often stylized and pronounced as "blin-blin". Furthermore, the Spanish word blinblineo also refers to bling and its style. Similarly, in French, "bling-bling" traditionally describes nouveau riche attitudes; such as "wearing expensive suits, stylish sunglasses and conspicuously large wristwatches" or anything that is ostentatious and can be considered of "poor taste". In German, it is usually used as simply "Bling".

== Criticism and response ==
The short film Bling: Consequences and Repercussions explains the troubled backstory of many of the diamonds jewelers often use to make the gaudy jewelry. Explicitly, the film takes issue with the fact that, occasionally, the diamonds were originally blood diamonds, that fuel wars, poverty, slavery, and killings across countries in Africa. Similarly, Bling: A Planet Rock (2007) documents and subsequently contrasts the flashy world of commercial hip-hop jewelry against the significant role diamonds play in the ten-year civil war in Sierra Leone.

From a different perspective, many people consider bling and its aesthetic as empowering, rather than literally and metaphorically likening the expensive chains to slavery.

== See also ==
- Hip-hop culture
- Braggadocio (rap)
- Grill (jewelry)
- Nameplate necklace

General

- Affluenza
- Camp
- Commodity fetishism
- Conspicuous consumption
- Status symbol

International

- Chav
