= Cross necklace =

Apparel bearing a symbol of Christianity

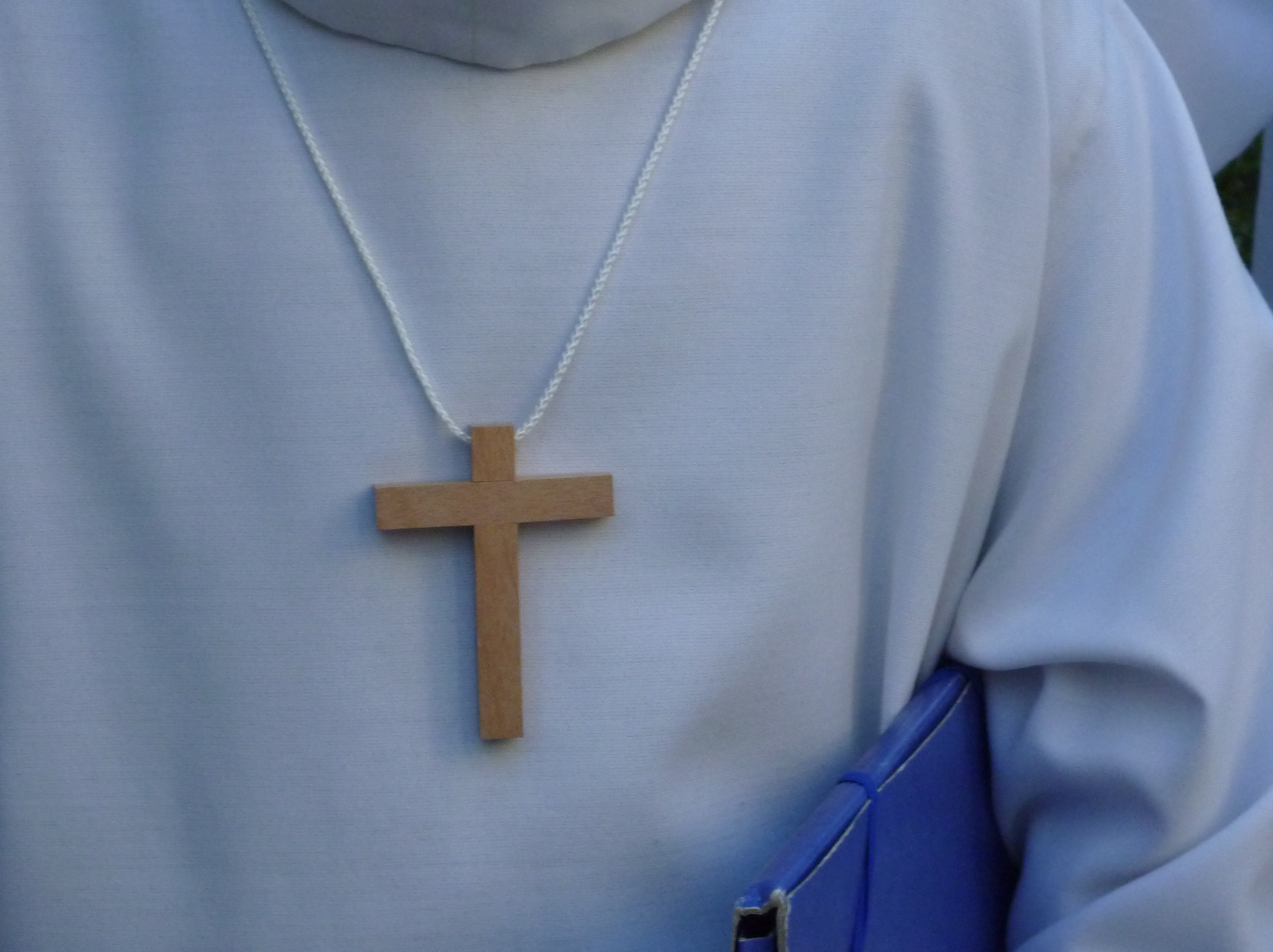
A cross necklace

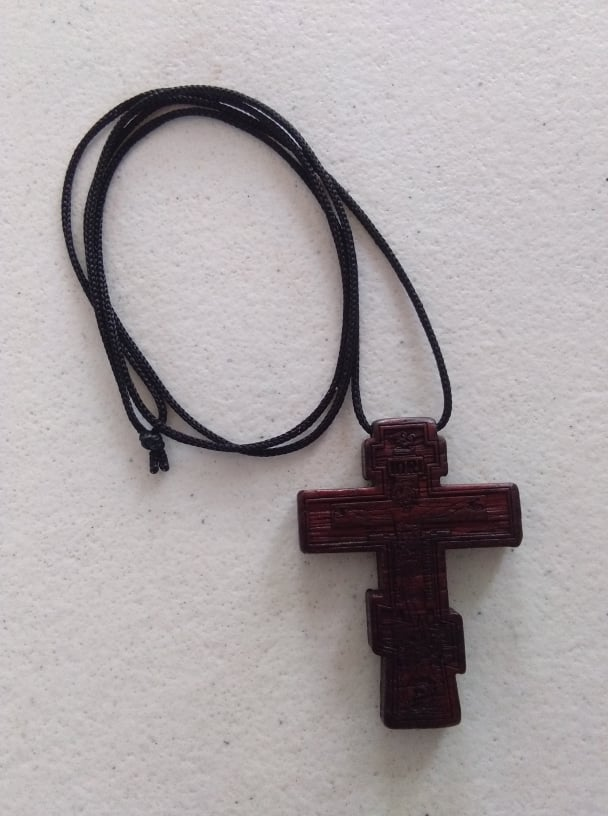
A cross necklace featuring an Orthodox cross, with three horizontal bars, the bottom bar at an angle

A cross necklace is any necklace featuring a Christian cross or crucifix as its pendant.

Crosses are often worn as an indication of commitment to the Christian faith, and are sometimes received as gifts for rites such as baptism and confirmation. Communicants of the Oriental Orthodox and Eastern Orthodox churches are expected to wear their baptismal cross necklaces at all times.

Some Christians believe that the wearing of a cross offers protection from evil, while others, Christian and non-Christian, wear cross necklaces as a fashion accessory.

The Metropolitan Museum of Art book Metropolitan Jewelry by Sophie McConnell and Alvin Grossman states: "In the first centuries of the Christian era, the cross was a clandestine symbol used by the persecuted adherents of the new religion." Many Christian bishops of various traditions, such as the Eastern Orthodox Church, wear a pectoral cross as a sign of their order.

Most adherents of the Ethiopian Orthodox Tewahedo Church will wear a cross attached to either a chain or a matäb, a silk cord. The matäb is tied about the neck at the time of baptism, and the recipient is expected to wear the matäb at all times. Women will often affix a cross or other pendant to the matäb, but this is not considered essential.

In some nations, such as the People's Socialist Republic of Albania, an atheist state, the wearing of cross necklaces was historically banned.

In two highly publicised British cases, nurse Shirley Chaplin and British Airways flight attendant Nadia Eweida were disciplined for wearing cross necklaces at work, in breach of their employment terms. Both took their cases to the European Court of Human Rights; Chaplin's case was dismissed, while Eweida was awarded damages on the grounds that the UK government had failed to weigh her right to religious expression heavily enough. In light of such cases, in 2012 the former archbishop of Canterbury of the Anglican Communion, Lord Carey of Clifton, and then head of the Roman Catholic Church in Scotland, Cardinal Keith O'Brien, have urged all Christians to wear cross necklaces regularly. In 2025, the United States Office of Personnel Management issued a memorandum to federal agencies for the protection of religious expression, such as the wearing of cross necklaces in the workplace.

== Gallery ==
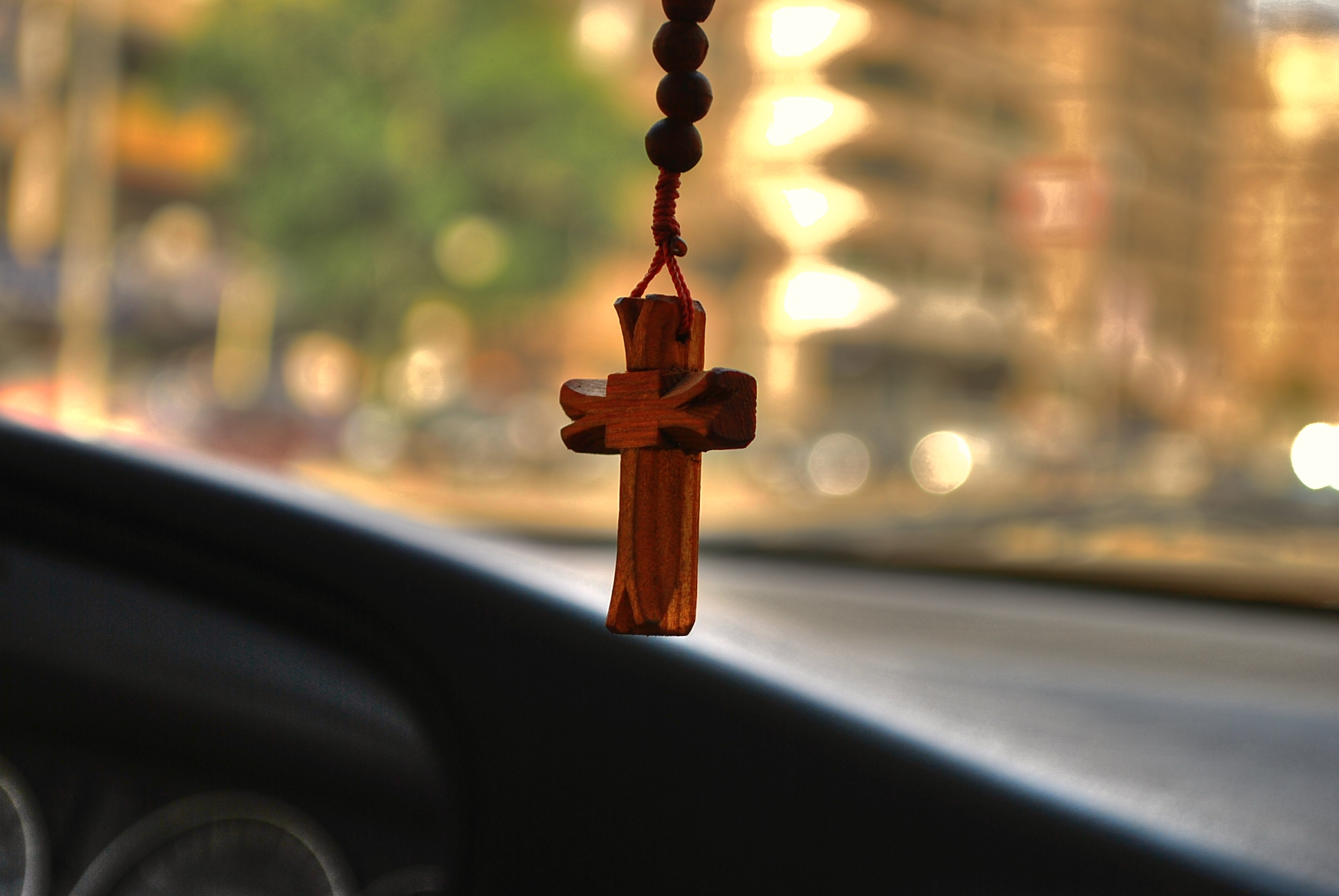
A rosary hanging from the rear-view mirror of a car

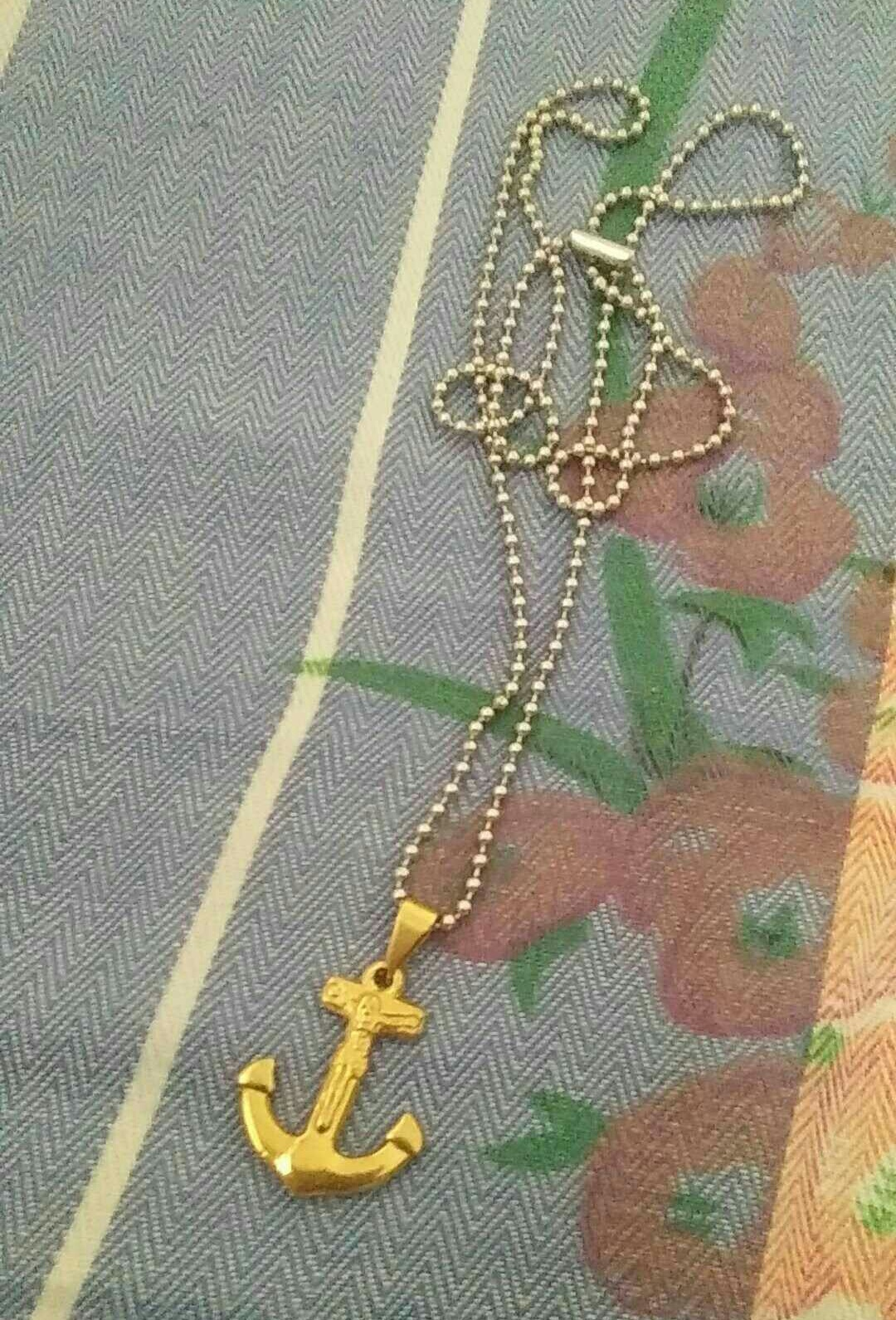
An anchored cross necklace

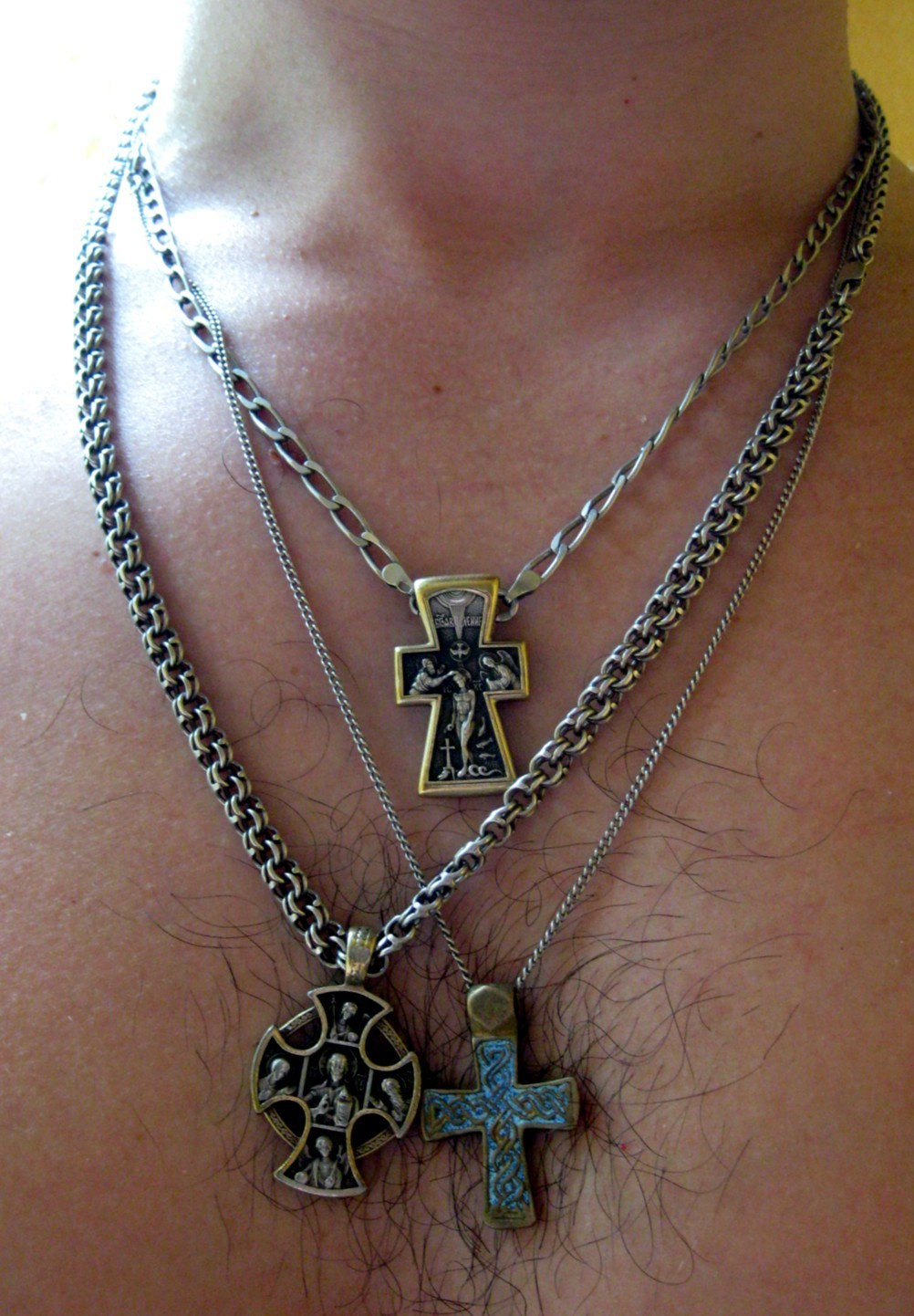
A man with three different cross necklaces

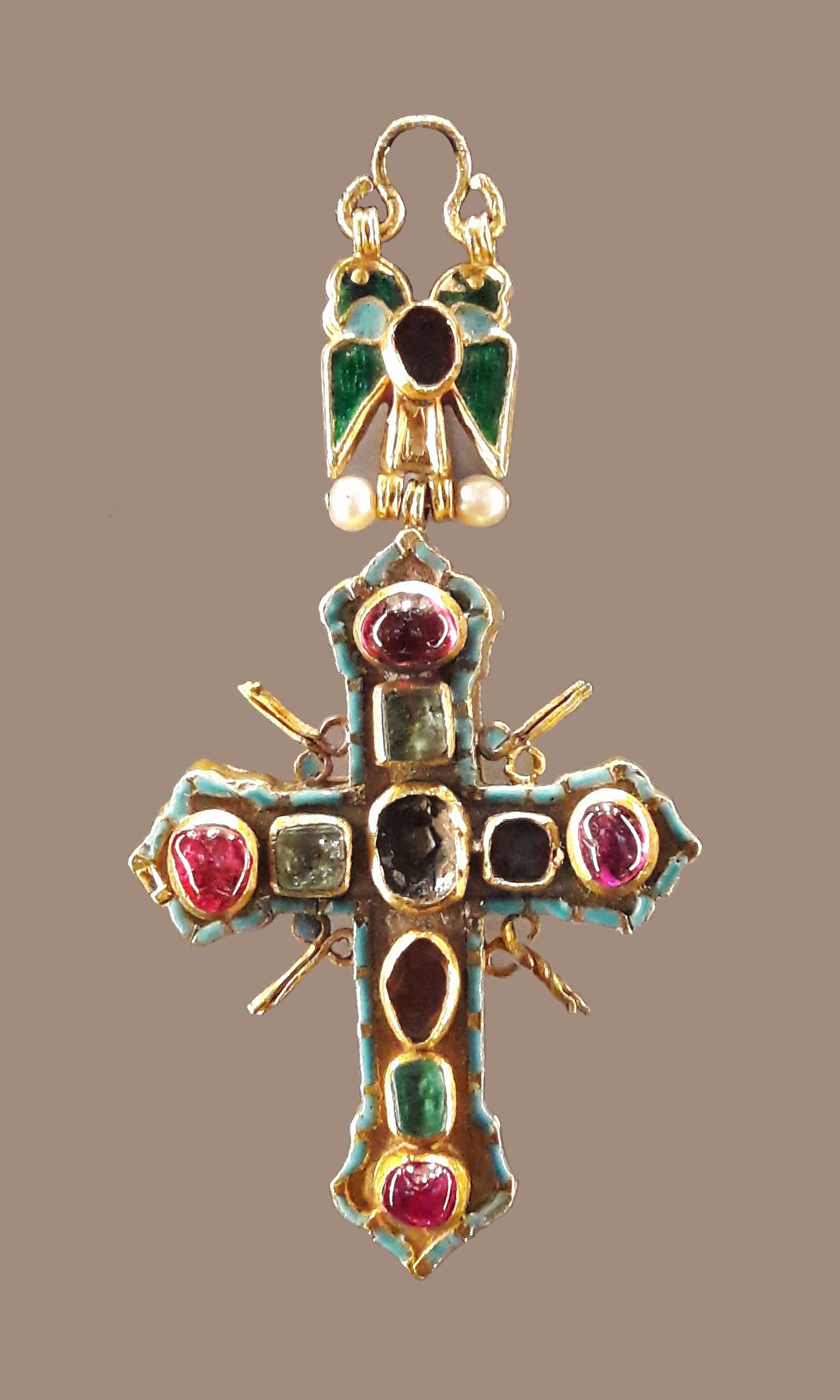
A cross pendant with double-headed eagle, made in Poland in the late 17th century

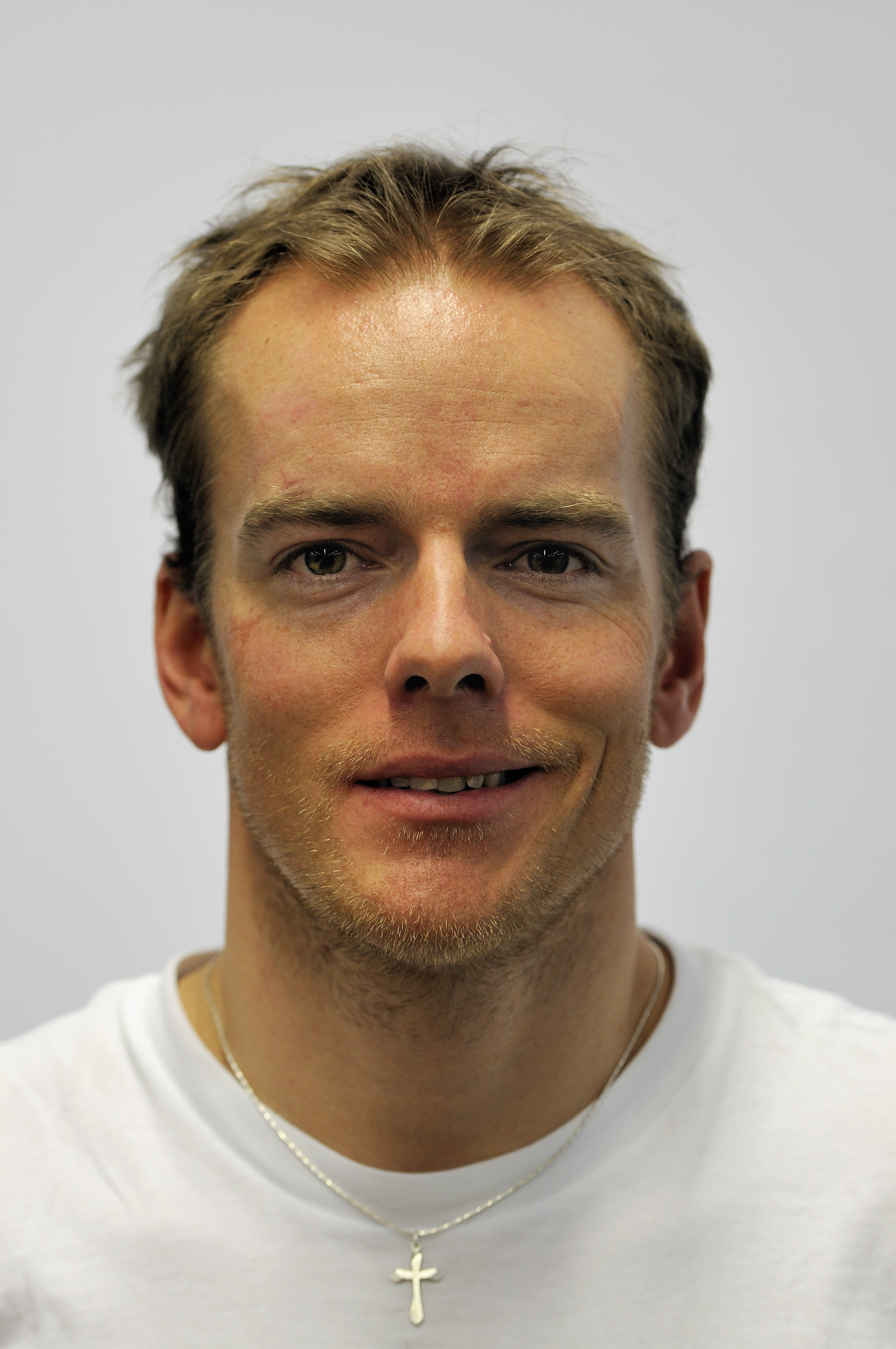
Jens Filbrich wearing a cross necklace

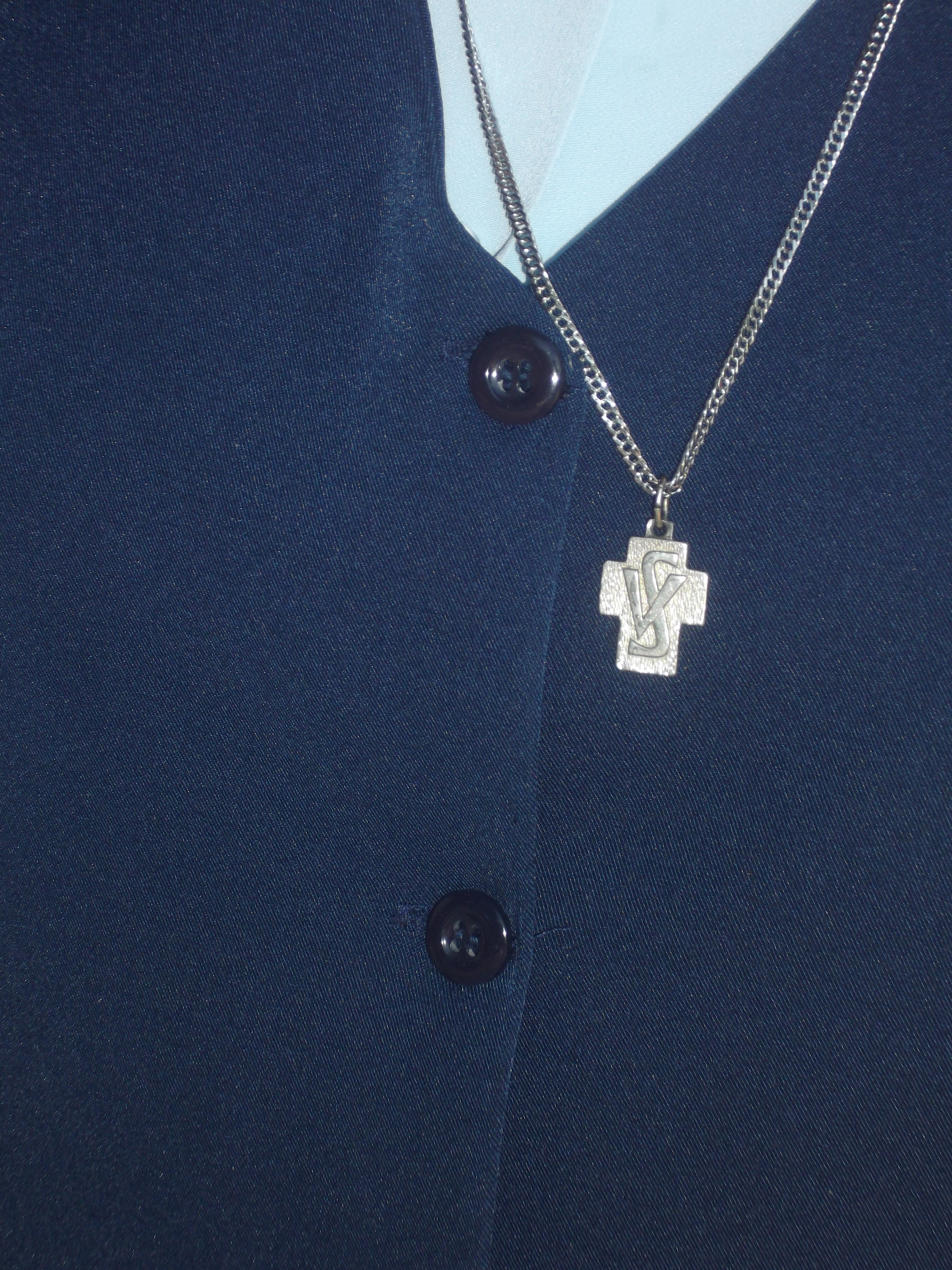
A cross necklace of the Daughters of Charity of Saint Vincent de Paul religious order

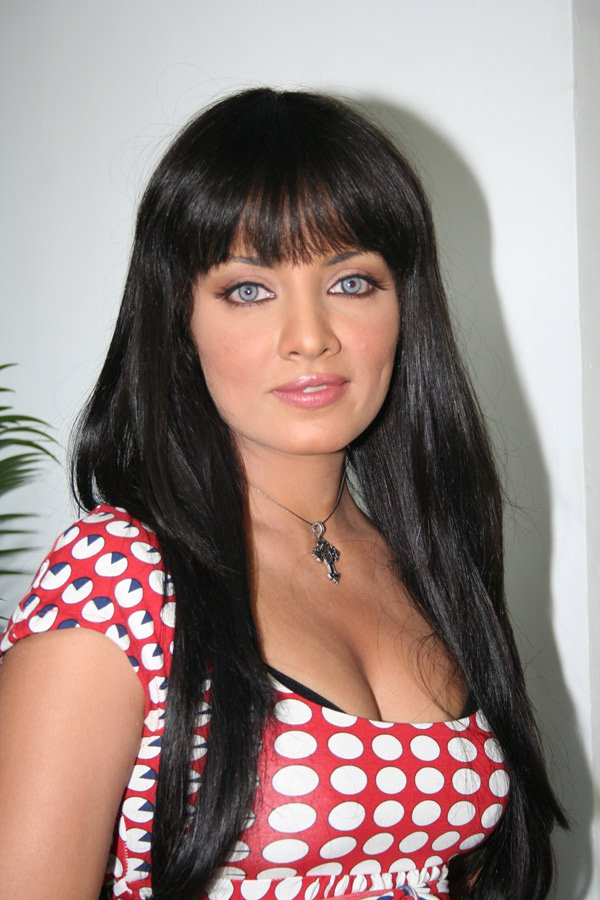
Celina Jaitley wearing a cross necklace

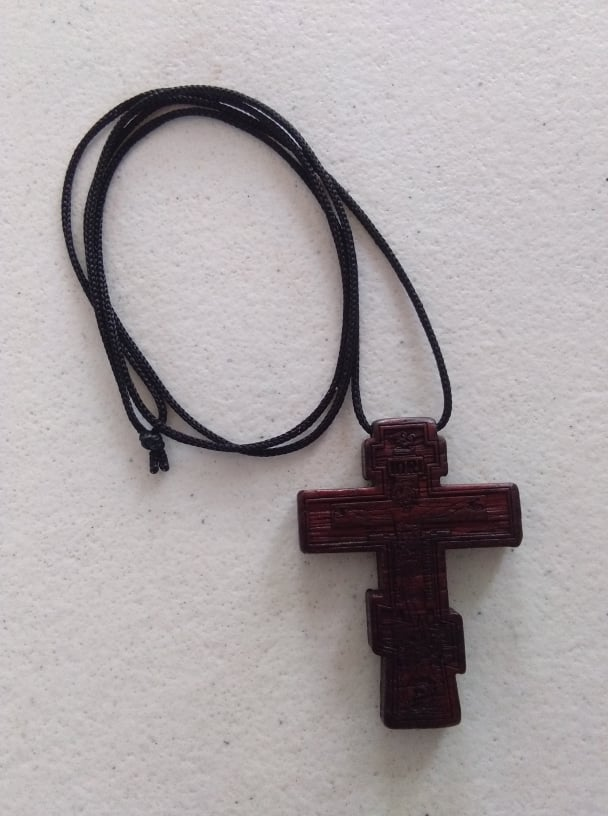
Eastern Orthodox Christian cross necklace made of wood

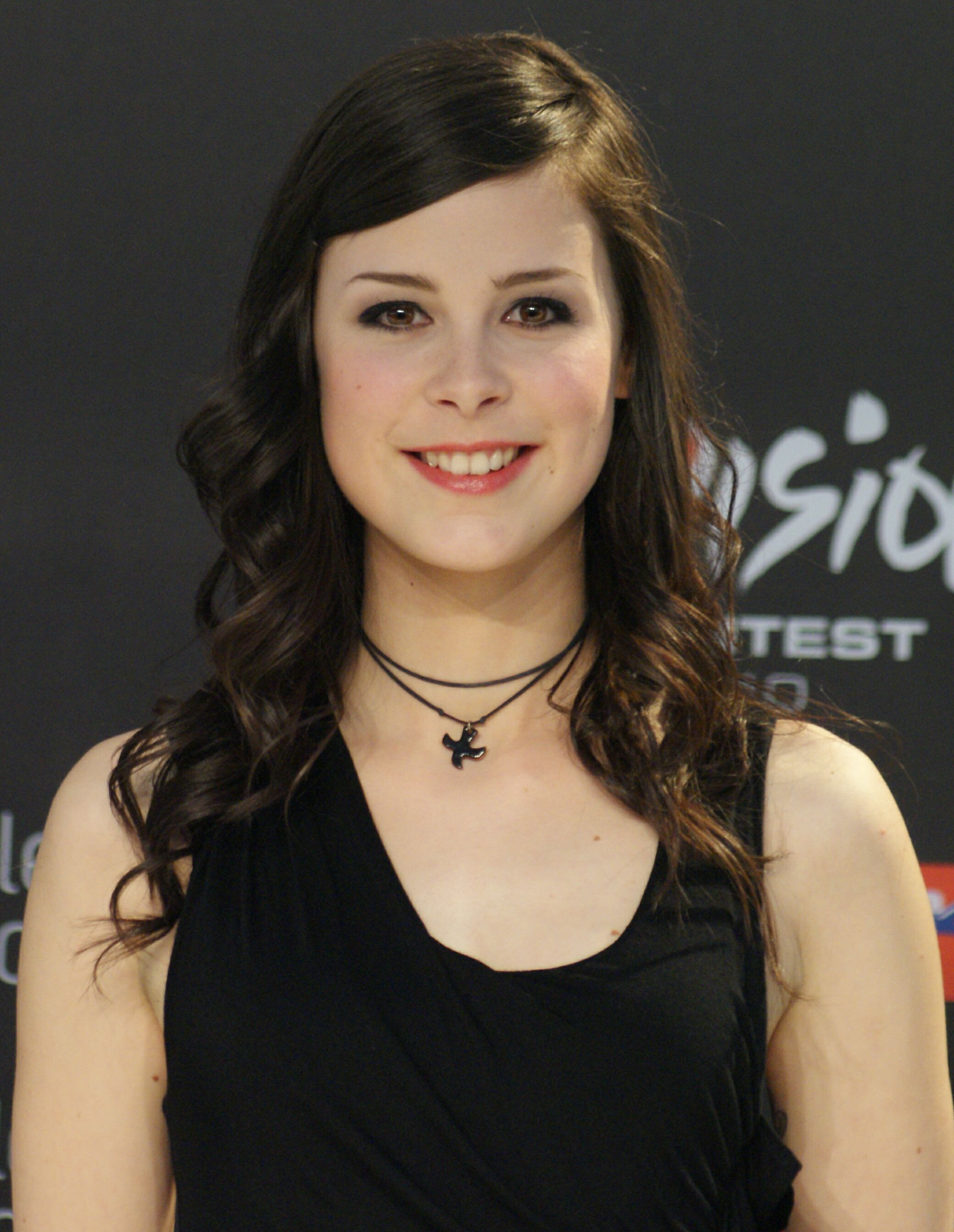
Lena Meyer-Landrut wearing a cross necklace of the ecumenical Christian Taizé Community

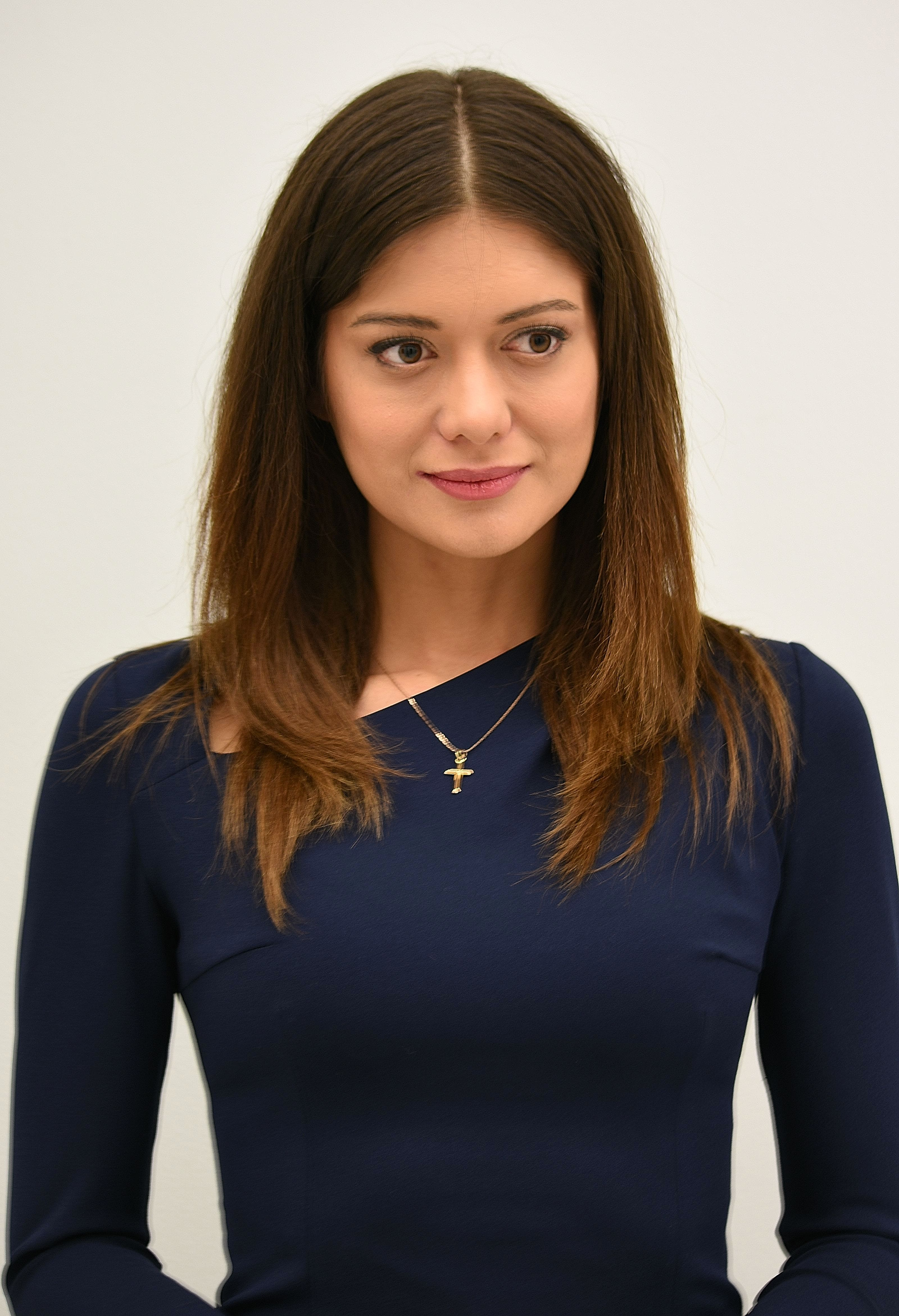
Miriam Shaded wearing a cross necklace

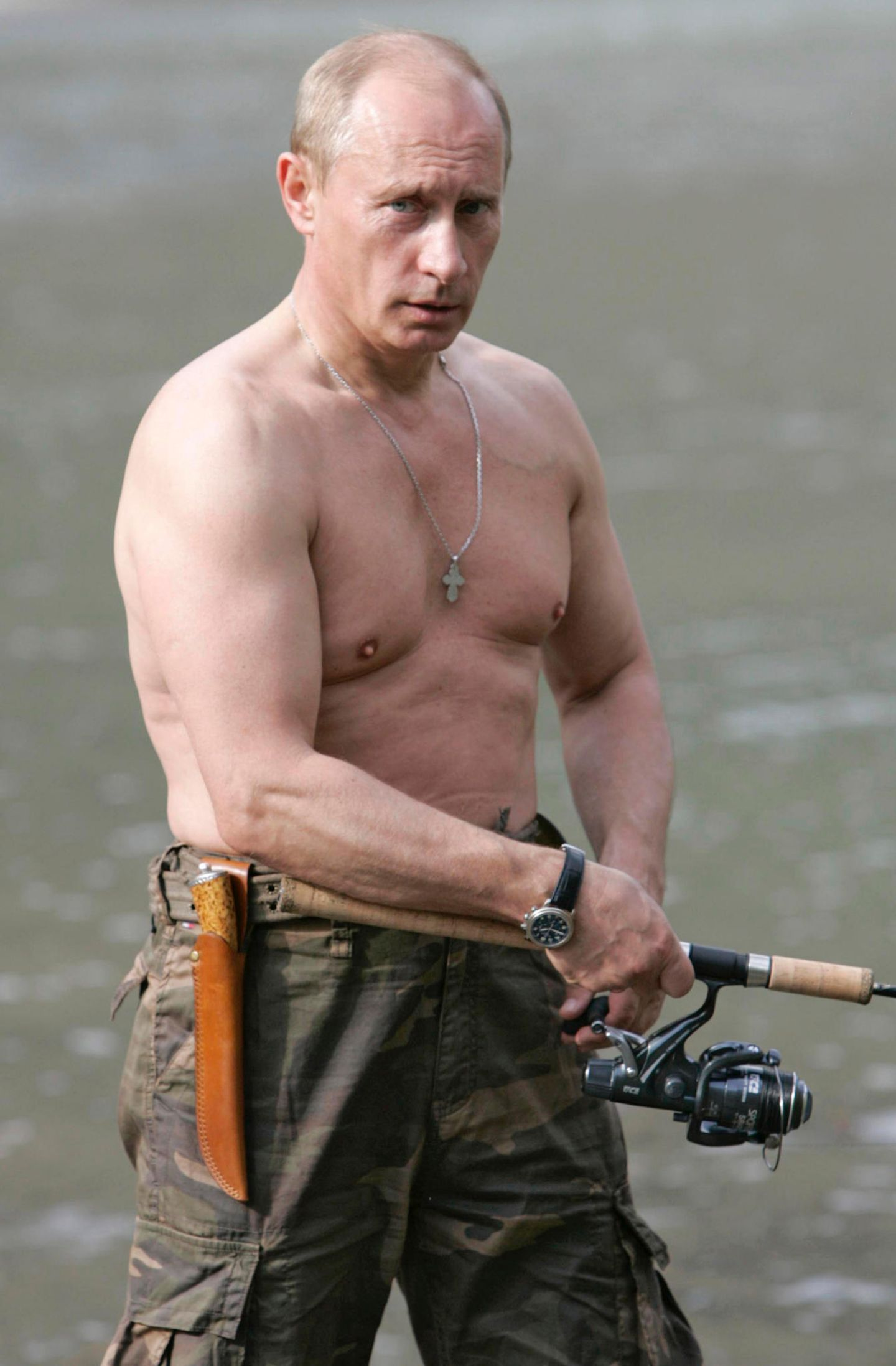
Vladimir Putin wearing a cross necklace

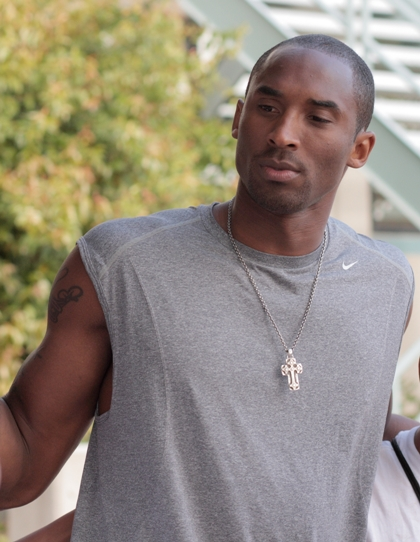
Kobe Bryant wearing a cross necklace

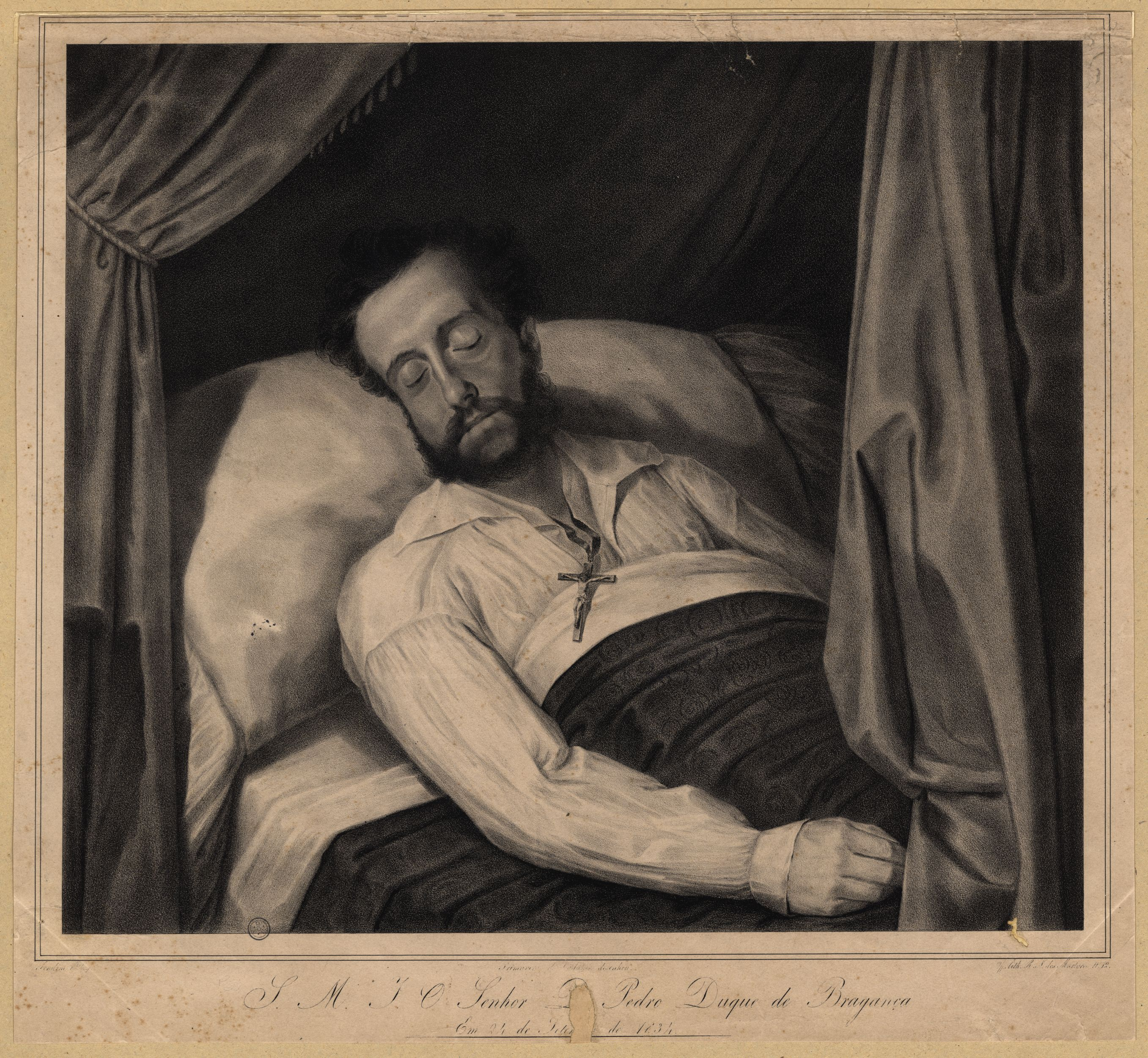
Emperor Pedro I of Brazil (also King of Portugal as Pedro IV) wearing a crucifix cross necklace on his deathbed

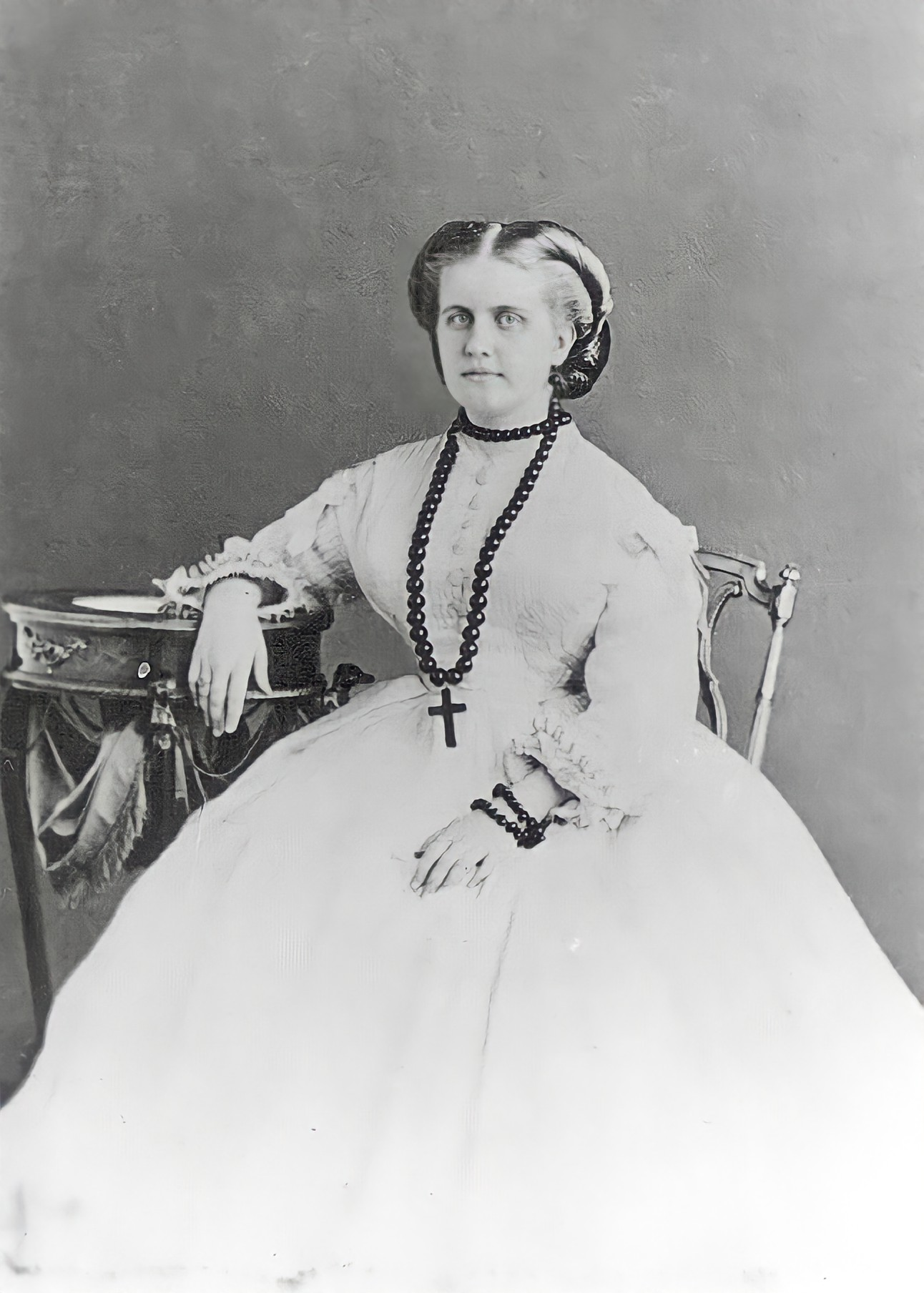
Princess Leopoldina of Brazil wearing a large cross necklace

== See also ==
- Sacramental
