= Hypebeast (company) =

Hong Kong–based digital media company

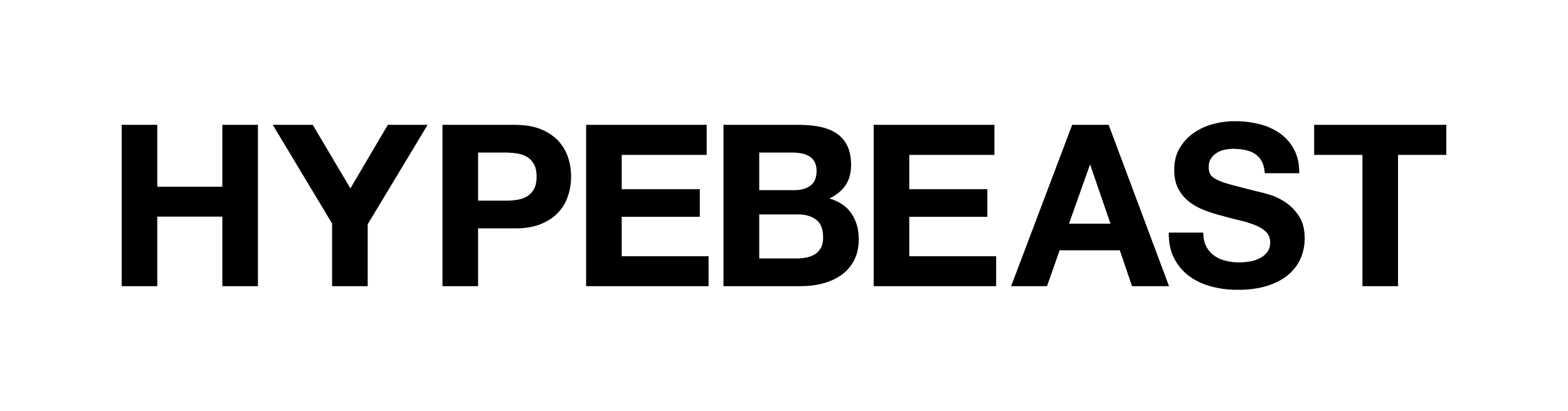
- Type: Public
- Traded as: SEHK: 150
- Industry: Media; Retail; E-commerce; Entertainment
- Founded: 2005
- Founder: Kevin Ma
- Headquarters: Hong Kong
- Website: hypebeast.com

Hypebeast is a Hong Kong–listed company that focuses on contemporary culture and lifestyle. It was originally founded in 2005 by Kevin Ma as a sneaker blog. Over the years, Hypebeast has expanded into other industries, including fashion, art, music, e-commerce, golf, cuisine and more.

Hypebeast's three major divisions are Hypemedia, its online editorial and social media platforms; Hypemaker, an in-house creative production agency; and HBX, a retail platform. In addition to the Hypebeast media platform, which is in multiple languages, there are also Hypebae and Popbee for women, Hypeart for art and Hypegolf for golf. In 2012, Hypebeast launched its print magazine, Hypebeast magazine.

== History ==
Hypebeast was originally started as a sneaker blog in 2005 by Kevin Ma. In 2012, the lifestyle, digital and streetwear focused site entered the retail sphere as HBX, selling fashion editor favourites. In 2017, it launched its creative agency, Hypemaker. In 2018, the company organized a 2-day cultural festival called Hypefest in New York City. In 2019, Hypebeast was transferred to the Main Board in the HKEX. In 2020, Hypebeans, a café, was opened in the HBX Hong Kong store. In 2022, the HBX New York flagship store was opened in Chinatown, New York. Also in 2022, the Hypegolf Shop opened in Japan.

== Recognition ==
In 2008, Hypebeast was recognized as one of Time magazine's 50 best websites. In 2017, it was recognized as one of Fast Company's most innovative companies. In 2018, it was ranked on Forbes Asia's 200 Best Under A Billion list.

== See also ==
- Streetwear § Hypebeast culture
