= Nameplate necklace =

Type of necklace

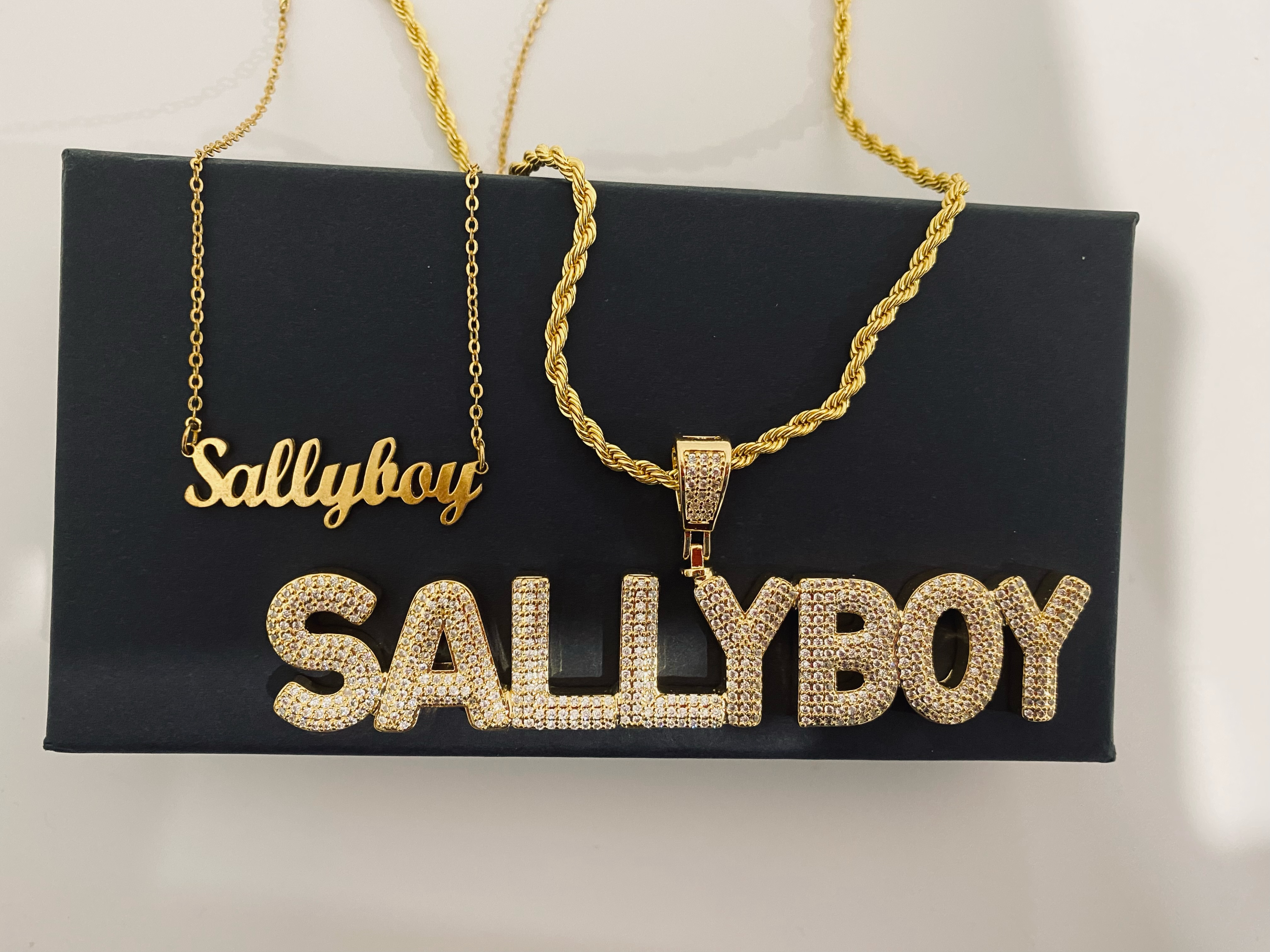
Two gold nameplate necklaces

A nameplate necklace (also known as a name necklace) is a type of necklace which displays a name, initials, or other words of choice. Originating among African-American and Latino communities during the 1980s and 1990s, nameplate necklaces have become a popular fashion piece all around the world.

== History ==
The nameplate necklace originated in African-American and Latino communities in the 1980s and 1990s as a form of cultural expression among wearers. During this time, nameplate necklaces were available from street vendors, with Fulton Street, Brooklyn, becoming a popular destination for buyers.

During the 1980s and 1990s, nameplate necklaces became a staple of hip hop culture, being popularised by artists like Big Daddy Kane and Slick Rick. By the early 2000s nameplate necklaces were mass-produced by large department stores such as Walmart, which mainly catered to those with common English names.

== Cultural significance ==
Given that nameplate necklaces are sometimes associated with low-income communities of colour, journalist Collier Meyerson claimed that nameplate necklaces arose as a "flashy and pointed rejection of the banality of white affluence". Rosa Salas described nameplate necklaces as a "political expression of personhood" among people who have been marginalised by "racial, ethnic and class-based hierarchies".

Meyerson generated some controversy in 2016 when she claimed that white people were engaging in cultural appropriation by wearing nameplate necklaces, claiming

"White girls and women have other stories, but they don’t have ours. It never feels like a homage to me when I see a white woman rocking a nameplate".

Katherine Timpf from National Review responded "cultures and trends are shifting all the time, and elements from outside sources are always inspiring mainstream fashion".

== In popular culture ==
- In the 1998 comedy-drama series, Sex And The City, the main character Carrie Bradshaw (Sarah Jessica Parker) wears a gold nameplate necklace displaying the name "Carrie". The necklace was incorporated into the show after Parker's stylist saw some "kids in the neighbourhood" wearing nameplate necklaces.
