= Miriam Shaded =

Polish human rights activist

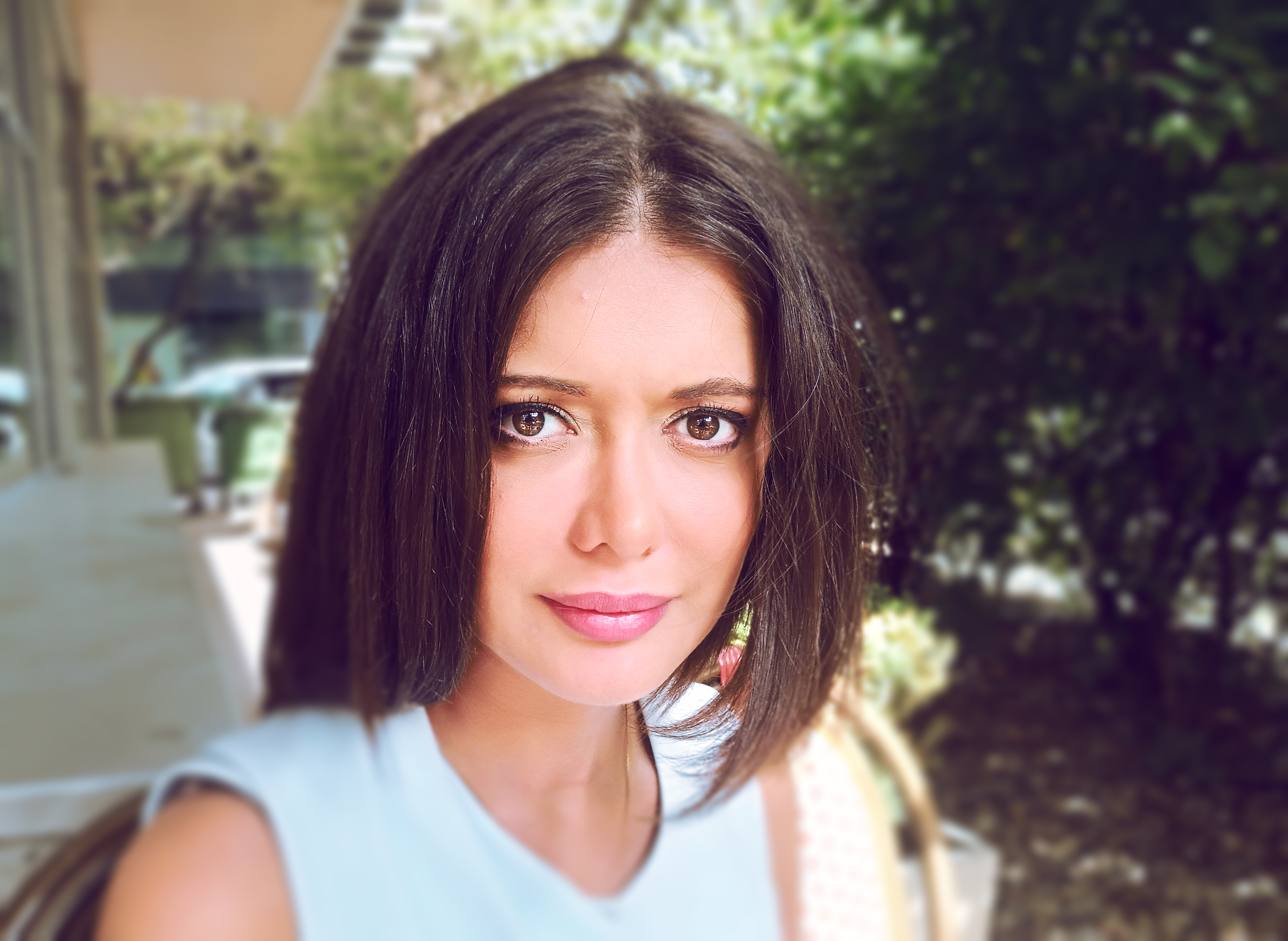
- Shaded in 2018
- Born: 29 June 1986 (age 40); Warsaw
- Education: Christian Theological Academy, Warsaw
- Occupations: entrepreneur, human rights activist
- Known for: founder of Estera Foundation

Miriam Shaded (born 29 June 1986, in Warsaw) is a Polish entrepreneur, human-rights activist and critic of Islam. She is the founder and president of the Estera Foundation tasked with bringing Christian refugees from Syria to Poland.

== Life and career ==
Shaded was born into a Polish-Syrian family in Warsaw as the youngest of seven siblings. Her mother is Polish. Her father, Moner Shaded, was born in Syria. He is a pastor of a Presbyterian church in Warsaw.

She took part in the beauty contest "Miss Egzotica 2015", although she had to leave before the finale. The parting statement from Miss Egzotica indicated that her divisive attitude towards other people was against the principles of the pageant. On the other hand, Shaded stated that this participation was only a couple of meetings, after which she left due to bad treatment of the participants by the organizers. She further stated that the only goal of her taking part in the pageant was a search for a forum to bring an attention to the fate of Christian refugees ignored by the media and government, which can be corroborated by the videos of her in the pageant still available in the Internet.

In 2015, Shaded took part in the elections to the Sejm (Polish parliament) as a candidate from the list of the party KORWiN. She received 3644 votes in the electoral district number 19 of the Republic of Poland. This was the second-best result in the party behind Janusz Korwin-Mikke, but both failed to enter the Sejm.

She promotes the intensification of help towards persecuted Christians in the Middle East and all over the world. For this purpose, she started a YouTube channel in early 2016 on which all her appearances and discussions are being translated into German and English.

Miriam Shaded was interviewed by many Polish and international newspapers, magazines and platforms (in some of which she appeared on the front cover) such as Wprost, Junge Freiheit, Gazeta Wyborcza, Rzeczpospolita, Do Rzeczy, the Yomiuri Shimbun, TVN, Superstacja, TBN, Euronews, TVP, ARD, BBC, Reuters, Fox News, TV Republika, Deutsche Welle, Washington Post, Die Zeit, and Der Spiegel.

Miriam Shaded appeared on the cover picture of the weekly magazine Wprost in 2016 (Nr. 10/2016 [1727]) on an occasion of her interview where she calls to ban Islam in Poland "because it contradicts the Constitution of Poland by limiting the personal freedoms, and especially the freedoms of women under Islam."
