= Elk (disambiguation) =

The elk (or wapiti, Cervus canadensis) is a large antlered mammal within the deer family.

Elk may also refer to:

== Wildlife ==
- Eurasian elk or moose (Alces alces), the largest extant species in the deer family
- Irish elk (Megaloceros giganteus, extinct), one of the largest deer that ever lived
- Whooper swan or elk, a large Northern Hemisphere swan

== Arts and entertainment ==
- Elk (.hack), a character in the .hack alternative history franchise
- Elk (album), 2005, by Inga Liljeström
- Elk (Milwaukee sculpture), a 1901 public artwork
- E L K, èlk or ELK, Australian hip hop artist on the Playback 808 label
- Thompson Elk Fountain, an outdoor fountain in Portland, Oregon, by Roland Hinton Perry

== Places ==
=== Poland ===
- Ełk, a town in northeastern Poland
- Ełk County
- Gmina Ełk
- Diocese of Ełk
- Ełk (hamlet)
- Ełk, river in Poland
- Ełk Lake
- Ełk Narrow Gauge Railway

== United States ==
- Elk, Fresno County, California
- Elk, Mendocino County, California
- Elk, Kansas
- Elk, Ohio
- Elk City, Oklahoma
- Elk, Washington
- Elk, West Virginia
- Elk, Wisconsin

== Technology ==
- Extension Language Kit, an implementation of the Scheme programming language
- ELK stack, a technology stack composed of Elasticsearch, Logstash, and Kibana, now called Elastic Stack
- Acorn Electron, nicknamed "Elk", an 8-bit microcomputer produced in the 1980s by British company Acorn Computers

== Transportation ==
- Elk, a locomotive of the South Devon Railway Eagle class
- Elk (steam tug), formerly operated on Puget Sound
- Elk (sternwheeler 1857), a steamboat

== Other uses ==
- Benevolent and Protective Order of Elks
- Elk (surname)
- Elk Mountains (Colorado)
- Elk v. Wilkins, a United States Supreme Court case

== See also ==
- Elk County (disambiguation)
- Elk Creek (disambiguation)
- Elk Lake (disambiguation)
- Elk Range (disambiguation)
- Elk River (disambiguation)
- Elk Township (disambiguation)
- Elko (disambiguation)
- Elks (disambiguation)
