= Elk Creek =

Elk Creek may refer to:

== Places ==
- Elk Creek, California, community in Glenn County
- Elk Creek, Kentucky
- Elk Creek, Nebraska
- Elk Creek, Virginia
- Elk Creek, Wisconsin
- Elk Creek Township (disambiguation)

== Streams ==
- Elk Creek (Colorado River tributary), a stream in Colorado
- Elk Creek (Turkey River tributary), a river in Iowa
- Elk Creek (Kansas), a river in Kansas
- Elk Creek (Rock River tributary), a stream in Minnesota
- Elk Creek (Gasconade River tributary), a stream in Missouri
- Elk Creek (Montana)
- Elk Creek (Niobrara River tributary), a stream in Rock County, Nebraska
- Elk Creek (Rogue River tributary), a stream in Oregon
- Elk Creek (Umpqua River tributary), a stream in Oregon
- Elk Creek (Lake Erie), Pennsylvania
- Elk Creek (Loyalsock Creek tributary), Pennsylvania
- Elk Creek (Pine Creek tributary), Pennsylvania
- Elk Creek (South Dakota)
- Elk Creek (West Virginia)
