= Elk Mountain =

Elk Mountain may refer to:

== Settlements ==
- Elk Mountain, Utah, a settlement in the U.S. state of Utah
- Elk Mountain, Wyoming, a settlement in the U.S. state of Wyoming

== Summits ==
- Elk Mountain (British Columbia), a mountain in British Columbia, Canada
- Elk Mountain (California), a mountain in Lake County, California, USA
- Elk Mountain (Grand County, Colorado), a mountain in the U.S. state of Colorado
- Elk Mountain (Routt County, Colorado), a mountain in the U.S. state of Colorado
- Elk Mountain (Maryland), a mountain ridge in the U.S. state of Maryland
- Elk Mountain (Carbon County, Montana), a mountain in Carbon County, Montana
- Elk Mountain (Flathead County, Montana), a mountain in Flathead County, Montana
- Elk Mountain (Lincoln County, Montana), a mountain in Lincoln County, Montana
- Elk Mountain (Madison County, Montana), a mountain in Madison County, Montana
- Elk Mountain (Missoula County, Montana), a mountain in Missoula County, Montana
- Elk Mountain (Park County, Montana), a mountain in Park County, Montana
- Elk Mountain (Sanders County, Montana), a mountain in Sanders County, Montana
- Elk Mountain (Sweet Grass County, Montana), a mountain in Sweet Grass County, Montana
- Elk Mountain (Nevada)
- Elk Mountain (Clallam County, Washington), in the Olympic Mountains
- Elk Mountain (West Virginia), part of the Shavers Fork Mountain Complex, West Virginia
- Elk Mountain (Teton County, Wyoming), a mountain in the Teton Range, Wyoming
- Elk Mountain (Carbon County, Wyoming), a mountain in the Medicine Bow Mountains, Wyoming

== Other ==
- Elk Mountain Ski Area, a ski resort in Union Dale, Pennsylvania, USA

== See also ==
- Elk Mountains (disambiguation)
- Elkhorn Mountains (disambiguation)
