= Loring =

Loring may refer to:

== People ==
=== Given name ===
- Loring Woart Bailey (1839–1925), American-Canadian geologist, botanist and university professor
- Loring M. Black Jr. (1886–1956), American lawyer and politician
- Loring Buzzell (1927–1959), American music publisher
- Loring Christie (1885–1941), Canadian diplomat
- Loring Coes (1812–1906), American inventor, industrialist and politician
- Loring Danforth (born 1949), American professor of anthropology
- Loring D. Dewey (1791–1867), early 19th-century Presbyterian minister
- Loring Mandel (1928–2020), American playwright and screenwriter
- Loring McMillen (1928–1991), American historian
- Loring Miner (1860–1935), American physician
- Loring Schuler (1886–1968), American journalist and editor
- Loring Smith (1890–1981), American actor
- Loring W. Tu, Taiwanese-American mathematician

=== Surname ===
- Loring (surname), includes a list of people with this surname

== Places ==
=== United States ===
- Loring, Alaska, a census-designated place
- Loring, Missouri, a ghost town
- Loring, Montana, an unincorporated town
- Loring Park, a park located in Minneapolis, Minnesota

=== Elsewhere ===
- Port Loring, Ontario, Canada, a community

=== Fictional ===
- Loring, Gloucestershire, a fictional English market town in the 1870 novel The Vicar of Bullhampton

== Other uses ==
- Charles Loring Highway, part of U.S. Route 1 in Maine
- HMS Loring (K565), a British frigate in commission in the Royal Navy from 1943 to 1945
- Loring Air Force Base, Limestone, Maine, United States, active from 1953 to 1995
  - Loring Air Force Base (CDP), discontinued
- Loring House (disambiguation), several historic buildings in the United States
- Loring International Airport, Limestone, Maine, United States
- Talleres Loring, a Spanish aircraft manufacturer
