= Black Hills and Fort Pierre Railroad =

Historical railroad in South Dakota, USA

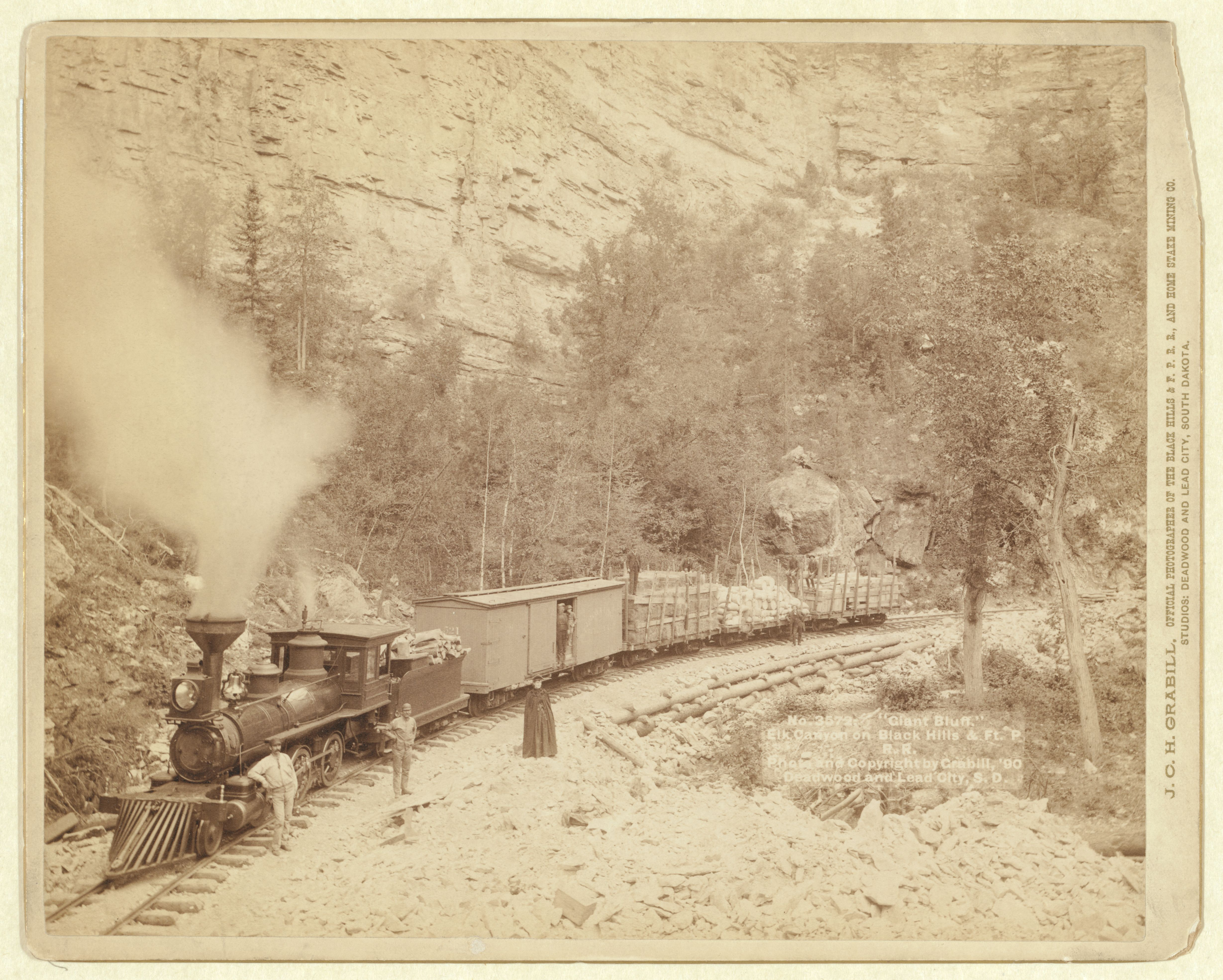
- Train on the Black Hills and Fort Pierre Railroad in 1890

Overview
- Headquarters: Lead, South Dakota
- Locale: Black Hills, South Dakota
- Dates of operation: 1882–1930

Technical
- Track gauge: 3 ft (914 mm)
- Length: 53.798 miles (86.579 km)

The Black Hills and Fort Pierre Railroad (BH&FP) was a 3 ft (914 mm) narrow gauge railroad in the Black Hills of the U.S. state of South Dakota. It was created by the Homestake Mining Company and initially ran from Lead to Calcite and Piedmont by way of Elk Creek. An alternate route was established to Piedmont and Calcite by way of Nemo and Stagebarn Canyon after numerous washouts made the Elk Creek route unviable. There was also a branch from the Nemo line connecting Este with a logging camp at Merritt. The railroad had 6.180 miles (9.946 km) of dual gauge track (with 4 ft 8 1/2 in (1,435 mm) standard gauge trackage) and another 47.618 miles (76.634 km) of 3 ft (914 mm) track; the total amount of track was 53.798 miles (86.579 km).

== History ==
The line was originally intended to haul timber to the Homestake Mining Company in Lead. On June 15, 1881, the railroad company was incorporated under the name Black Hills Railroad Company. The name was changed to the Black Hills and Fort Pierre Railroad on July 10, 1882. On November 29, 1881, a mule team hauled the first locomotive, a Porter 2-6-0, from Fort Pierre to Lead. The first track was laid from Lead to Woodville in 1881, and in 1886, the track was extended 15 miles (24 km) to Bucks. In 1890, the line was extended 21.5 miles (34.6 km) to Piedmont. A line 14 miles (23 km) long that ran from Bucks to Este was built in 1898.

On July 28, 1901, the Burlington and Missouri River Railroad, which was a subsidiary of the Chicago, Burlington and Quincy Railroad (CB&Q), bought the railroad. The CB&Q handled construction after July 1901. The three-rail line was then built from Lead to the Homestake Mine. In 1906, a small line was created from Este to Merritt, and was about 4 miles (6.4 km) long. A flood wiped out about 15.5 miles (24.9 km) of track from Bucks to Calcite and had to be replaced by a new line from Este to Stage Barn Canyon, where it would connect to a surviving line. In the 1920s, increasing automobile traffic led to the decline of the railroad. The Calcite Mine, the only source of traffic remaining on the railroad at the time, was planned to shut down. On October 25, 1929, plans to shut down the railroad were completed; permission to do so from the state and federal governments was received on December 14. The railroad operated until March 20, 1930, and the track was dismantled that spring. The company was officially disestablished in 1932.

=== 1886 fire ===
The Black Hills and Fort Pierre Railroad's importance was demonstrated during an 1886 wildfire, which swept through the Black Hills for 15–20 miles before being stopped. The railroad's passenger train, which happened to be running through the valley at the time, became a rescue train, picking people up as it rattled through the valley. On its way to Deadwood, the narrow gauge engine and its string of crowded cars crossed 15 burning bridges before reaching the safety of Deadwood. Following the fire, The railroad was quickly rebuilt, and regular operations resumed soon after.

=== Attempted train robberies ===
When payday came around, it was always customary for the Homestake Mining Company to send around $12,000 on a special train to pay loggers and miners. This was not confidential info, and there was temptation amongst many outlaws in the Black Hills. There were 3 attempts to hold up the train, and all three failed. The first time, the robbers misunderstood each other's instructions and did not have their guns ready at the right moment. The second time, The railroad's schedule was thrown off by an hour because the Homestake Mining Company hosted a picnic for its mechanics and machinists. The bandits were unable to even scare the train's paymaster. But the third and final time proved to be very dramatic. The robbers removed fishplates from the tracks in Reno Gulch, with the expectation that the train would come rolling along at speed, hit the damaged track, and derail. But the bandits were foiled once again: just before it reached Reno Gulch, it stopped to let a section crew get off. The train was still picking up speed when it crawled up to the damaged track, at which time the engineer stopped the train once he felt the spread rails beneath the engine. The moment the train stopped, the robbers jumped out of hiding. The engineer blasted his whistle and a gunfight began. One of the outlaws was shot, and the others fled but were soon apprehended. Thus, the third attempt at a "great train robbery" was once again unsuccessful.

== See also ==
- Deadwood Central Railroad
- List of South Dakota railroads
