= Elk Township, Michigan =

Elk Township is the name of some places in the U.S. state of Michigan:

- Elk Township, Lake County, Michigan
- Elk Township, Sanilac County, Michigan

== See also ==
- Elk Rapids Township, Michigan in Antrim County
- Elkland Township, Michigan in Tuscola County
- Elk Township (disambiguation)
