= Deadwood Central Railroad =

Railroad in South Dakota, U.S.

Overview
- Headquarters: Deadwood, South Dakota
- Reporting mark: DCRX
- Locale: Black Hills, South Dakota United States
- Dates of operation: 1888–1930

Technical
- Track gauge: 3 ft (914 mm)
- Length: 15.781 miles (25.397 km)

The Deadwood Central Railroad (DCRX) was a 3 ft (914 mm) narrow gauge railroad in the U.S. state of South Dakota. It was founded by Deadwood, South Dakota resident J.K.P. Miller and his associates in 1888 to serve their mining enterprises in the Black Hills. In 1928, the railroad stretched for a total length of 15.781 miles (25.397 km).

== History ==
The first intent of the railroad was to connect Deadwood and Lead City. The company was organized on August 20, 1888, and, on September 21, the railroad was chartered. In 1893, the railroad was bought out by the Burlington and Missouri River Railroad, a subsidiary of the Chicago, Burlington and Quincy Railroad (CB&Q). The line continued to operate as the Deadwood Central Railroad.

In 1902, the track between Lead and Deadwood was electrified and passenger service was provided with 3 ft (914 mm) narrow gauge interurban cars. Between Pluma and Deadwood, the tracks were shared with the 4 ft 8 1/2 in (1,435 mm) standard gauge CB&Q, with a third rail laid to make the track dual gauge. This service was abandoned in 1924 with the permission of the Interstate Commerce Commission, due to operating losses and deterioration of equipment. In 1904, the Burlington and Missouri River Railroad name was dropped after a policy change, and all railroads operated by it began being operated under the name of the CB&Q.

In total, the railroad had operated nearly 26 miles (42 km) of track, but over time, much of that was abandoned and taken up. The railroad also operated six locomotives. Due to the stock market crash of 1929, like other local railroads, the Deadwood Central Railroad was abandoned in 1930, and trucks began to operate in its place. One of the locomotives was dismantled in 1930, and another was leased to the Colorado and Southern Railway but was dismantled after being returned to the CB&Q in 1939.

The name was briefly revived at the Chicago Railroad Fair of 1948-49 when it was applied to the 3-foot (0.91 m) gauge excursion train which ran the length of the grounds, a popular ride for visitors to the Fair, which charged 10 cents per passenger. The train, supplied for the Fair by CB&Q, consisted of refurbished Colorado and Southern Number 9, a 2-6-0 built in 1882, and coaches, open observation cars and a railway post office car which had been built new by CB&Q in 1880's style. The complete train was acquired in 1956 by the Black Hills Central Railroad, but the Deadwood Central name was not continued.

== See also ==
- Black Hills and Fort Pierre Railroad
