= Sleeping Giant =

Sleeping Giant or The Sleeping Giant may refer to:

== Geology ==
- Elk Mountain (Routt County, Colorado), known locally as The Sleeping Giant), a mountain near Steamboat Springs, Colorado, USA
- Sleeping Giant (Connecticut), a traprock mountain ridge in Hamden, Connecticut, USA
- Sleeping Giant (Kauai), a mountain ridge on the island of Kauai near Kapaa, Hawaii, USA
- Sleeping Giant mountain and ridge in Montana in the USA, part of Sleeping Giant Wilderness Study Area
- Sleeping Giant (Ontario), a formation of mesas on Sibley Peninsula, Ontario, Canada
- The Sleeping Giant (Abercraf), local name for hill called Cribarth, Powys, Wales
- The Sleeping Giant, a hill near the village of Kinloch Rannoch in Perth and Kinross, Scotland
- The Sleeping Giant, a rock formation in the Nausori Highlands, Fiji
- The Sleeping Giant, a hill in the Cayo District of Belize, near the point at which the Hummingbird Highway crosses the Sibun River
- Inis Tuaisceart, also known as the Sleeping Giant, one of the Blasket Islands, Kerry, Ireland
- Te Mata Peak, a peak in Hawke's Bay, New Zealand that is also known as the Sleeping Giant

== Titled works ==
- Sleeping Giant (film) (2015), a Canadian film
- The Sleeping Giant (album), by rapper Sunny Boy
- "The Sleeping Giant", an episode of the animated television series Care Bears
- "Sleeping Giant", a song by Mastodon from the album Blood Mountain
- "Sleeping Giant", a song by Flobots from the album Noenemies
- "Sleeping Giant", a song by Dream Theater from the album A View from the Top of the World
- Sleeping Giant, a mixtape by Tajai
- Sleeping Giants, the debut novel of Sylvain Neuvel about the discovery and development of alien artifacts and technology on Earth
- Sleeping Giants, an album by the American hard rock band Heaven Below
- Sleeping Giants, an album by the American musician David Ellefson
- "Sleeping Giant," a 1948 children's story about the Connecticut mountain, by Eleanor Estes

== Other uses ==
- King asleep in mountain, a common folklore and legend motif
- Sleeping Giant (band), American Christian metal band
- Isoroku Yamamoto's sleeping giant quote regarding the attack on Pearl Harbor
- Sleeping Giants, an internet activism initiative
