= Elkland =

Elkland may refer to:

- Elkland (band), a short-lived American band
- Elkland, Missouri
- Elkland, Pennsylvania
- Elkland Township (disambiguation) (multiple locations)
