= Elk Mountains =

Elk Mountains may refer to:

- Elk Mountains (Colorado), United States
- Elk Mountains (Idaho), United States
- Elk Mountains (Nevada), United States
- Elk Mountains (New Mexico), United States
- Elk Mountains (North Carolina), United States
- Elk Mountains (South Dakota), United States
- West Elk Mountains, Colorado, United States

== See also ==
- Elk Mountain (disambiguation)
- Elk Range (California) in California, United States
- Elk Range (Canada) in the Canadian Rockies
- Elk Mountain Ski Area in Pennsylvania, United States
