= Elkport, Iowa =

- City
- Location of Elkport, Iowa
- Coordinates: 42°44′31″N 91°16′29″W
- Country: United States
- State: Iowa
- County: Clayton

Area
  - Total: 0.25 sq mi (0.64 km^{2})
  - Land: 0.25 sq mi (0.64 km^{2})
  - Water: 0 sq mi (0.00 km^{2})
- Elevation: 653 ft (199 m)

Population (2020)
  - Total: 29
  - Density: 116.7/sq mi (45.05/km^{2})
- Time zone: UTC-6 (Central (CST))
  - Summer (DST): UTC-5 (CDT)
- ZIP code: 52044
- Area code: 563
- FIPS code: 19-24825
- GNIS feature ID: 2394659

Elkport is a city in Clayton County, Iowa, United States. The population was 29 at the time of the 2020 census, down from 88 in 2000.

== History ==
Elkport was laid out as a town in 1855. It was named from the Elk Creek.

The town was severely damaged by floods in May 2004. After the floods, all residents of the town chose federal buyout, selling their homes to the United States federal government for demolition. In September 2006, nearly all of the buildings of Elkport were demolished.

== Demographics ==
Historical population
Census	Pop.	Note	%±
1880	243		—
1890	297		22.2%
1900	326		9.8%
1910	210		−35.6%
1920	202		−3.8%
1930	116		−42.6%
1940	130		12.1%
1950	99		−23.8%
1960	100		1.0%
1970	87		−13.0%
1980	98		12.6%
1990	82		−16.3%
2000	88		7.3%
2010	37		−58.0%
2020	29		−21.6%
U.S. Decennial Census

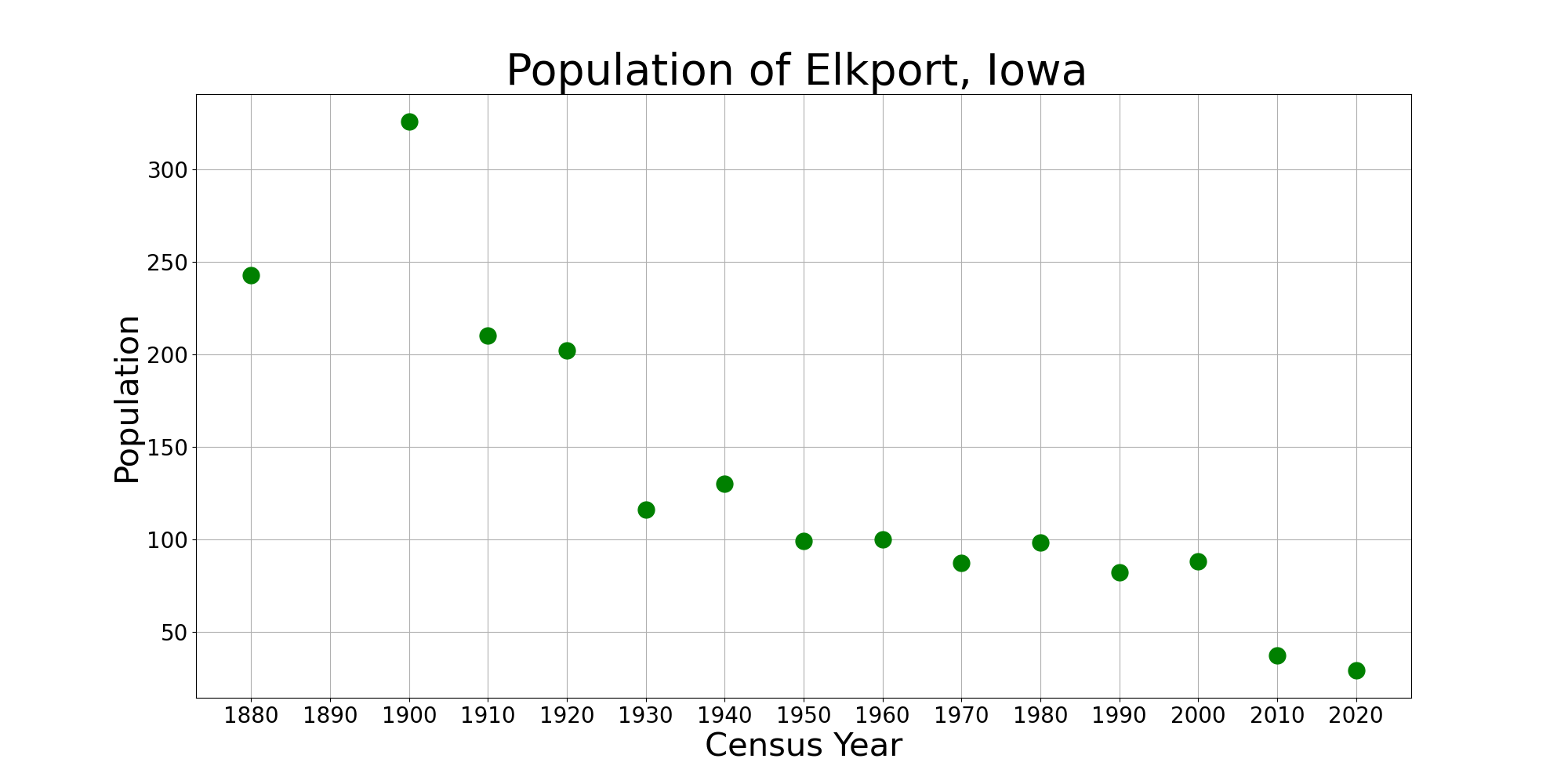
The population of Elkport, Iowa from US census data

=== 2020 census ===
As of the census of 2020, there were 29 people, 4 households, and 4 families residing in the city. The population density was 116.7 inhabitants per square mile (45.0/km^{2}). There were 12 housing units at an average density of 48.3 per square mile (18.6/km^{2}). The racial makeup of the city was 96.6% White, 0.0% Black or African American, 0.0% Native American, 0.0% Asian, 0.0% Pacific Islander, 0.0% from other races and 3.4% from two or more races. Hispanic or Latino persons of any race comprised 0.0% of the population.

Of the 4 households, 25.0% of which had children under the age of 18 living with them, 100.0% were married couples living together, 0.0% were cohabitating couples, 0.0% had a female householder with no spouse or partner present and 0.0% had a male householder with no spouse or partner present. 0.0% of all households were non-families. 0.0% of all households were made up of individuals, 0.0% had someone living alone who was 65 years old or older.

The median age in the city was 45.8 years. 34.5% of the residents were under the age of 20; 0.0% were between the ages of 20 and 24; 10.3% were from 25 and 44; 44.8% were from 45 and 64; and 10.3% were 65 years of age or older. The gender makeup of the city was 41.4% male and 58.6% female.

=== 2000 census ===
As of the census of 2000, there were 88 people, 33 households, and 25 families residing in the city. The population density was 470.2 inhabitants per square mile (181.5/km^{2}). There were 34 housing units at an average density of 181.7 per square mile (70.2/km^{2}). The racial makeup of the city was 100.00% White.

There were 33 households, out of which 45.5% had children under the age of 18 living with them, 60.6% were married couples living together, 6.1% had a female householder with no husband present, and 24.2% were non-families. 24.2% of all households were made up of individuals, and 12.1% had someone living alone who was 65 years of age or older. The average household size was 2.67 and the average family size was 3.04.

In the city, the population was spread out, with 31.8% under the age of 18, 2.3% from 18 to 24, 28.4% from 25 to 44, 23.9% from 45 to 64, and 13.6% who were 65 years of age or older. The median age was 35 years. For every 100 females, there were 114.6 males. For every 100 females age 18 and over, there were 114.3 males.

The median income for a household in the city was $24,375, and the median income for a family was $28,125. Males had a median income of $23,750 versus $17,500 for females. The per capita income for the city was $11,518. There were 10.5% of families and 6.9% of the population living below the poverty line, including no under eighteens and 23.1% of those over 64.

== Education ==
The municipality is within the boundary of the Central Community School District.
