= Loring House (disambiguation) =

Loring House is a historical building in Berkeley, California, U.S.

Loring House may also refer to:

- George Loring House, a historic house in Somerville, Massachusetts, U.S.
- Harrison Loring House, a historic house in Boston, Massachusetts, U.S.
- Loring House Apartments, a historic housing complex in Portland, Maine, U.S.

== See also ==
- Loring (disambiguation)
