= Elk Creek Township =

Elk Creek Township may refer to one of the following places in the United States:

- Elk Creek Township, Wright County, Missouri
- Elk Creek Township, Custer County, Nebraska
- Elk Creek Township, Erie County, Pennsylvania
