= Elco =

Elco or ELCO may refer to:

== Places ==
- Elco, Illinois
- Elco, Pennsylvania

== Schools ==
- El Camino College
- Eastern Lebanon County High School, a school in Myerstown, Pennsylvania
- El Camino High School (South San Francisco)

== Businesses ==
- Elco Holdings, an Israeli industrial group
- Electric Launch Company, manufacturer of electric boats and yachts, and (during World War II) PT boats and air rescue craft, today Elco Motor Yachts
  - Elco, a type of PT boat designed by the Electric Launch Company and built during World War II
  - Electric Boat Company (today General Dynamics Electric Boat), primary submarine contractor of the U.S. Navy and former parent of Elco
- Elco, a historic Swiss watchmaker associated with the Era Watch Company

== Other uses ==
- Elco Theatre, former name of Lerner Theatre, Elkhart, Indiana, US
- Electrolytic capacitor
- Festival de Cine Entre Largos y Cortos de Oriente, a Venezuelan film festival

== See also ==
- Elko (disambiguation)
