= Elko (disambiguation) =

Elko is a city and county seat and the most-populated place in Nevada.

Elko may refer to:

== Place names ==
=== Canada ===
- Elko, British Columbia

=== United States ===
- Elko, Georgia, an unincorporated community
- Elko, Kentucky, a former unincorporated community
- Elko, Minnesota, a former city
- Elko, Missouri, an unincorporated community
- Elko County, Nevada, a county
- Elko, New York, a former town
- Elko, South Carolina, a town
- Elko New Market, Minnesota, a city established in 2006
- Elko Tract, a tract of land that featured a fake town and a decoy airfield during World War II, in Henrico County, Virginia

== Transportation ==
- Elko Station, a passenger rail station in Elko, Nevada
- Elko Regional Airport, an airport in Elko, Nevada
- Elko/Lionel P. Demers Memorial Airpark, an airport near Elko, British Columbia

== Other uses ==
- Elko (album), a live album by Railroad Earth
- Elko (surname), surname
- ELKO field, a spinor field in theoretical physics
- Elko Grupa, a Latvia-based IT company
- ELKO, the Icelandic brand used by the Nordic consumer electronics retailer Elkjøp
- Elko Speedway, a race track in Elko New Market, Minnesota

== See also ==
- Elco (disambiguation)
