= Elk Creek Township, Wright County, Missouri =

Township in the American state of Missouri

Coordinates: 37.41076°N 92.46933°W

Elk Creek Township is an inactive township in Wright County, in the U.S. state of Missouri.

Elk Creek Township was erected in 1841, taking its name from Elk Creek.
