= Elks (disambiguation) =

The elk (pl.: elk or elks; Cervus canadensis) is a large antlered mammal within the deer family.

Elks may also refer to:

== Businesses and organizations ==
- Benevolent and Protective Order of Elks, the American fraternal organization
- Improved Benevolent and Protective Order of Elks of the World, historically African-American
- Elks of Canada, counterpart of the original American organization
- The Elks, the Swedish national team in Aussie Football
- The Edmonton Elks, a team in the Canadian Football League

== Places ==
- Elks, Louisiana, an unincorporated community in the United States
- West Elks AVA, Colorado wine region in Delta County

== Technology ==
- Embeddable Linux Kernel Subset (ELKS), a Linux-like for Intel IA-16 architecture

== See also ==
- List of Elks buildings
- Elx, another name of Elche, a town in Spain
- Elk (disambiguation)
