= Merritt, South Dakota =

- Ghost town
- Location of Merritt in South Dakota.
- Coordinates: 44°08′27″N 103°34′07″W
- Country: United States
- State: South Dakota
- Counties: Lawrence and Pennington
- Elevation: 5,105 ft (1,556 m)
- Time zone: UTC-7 (MST)
  - Summer (DST): UTC-6 (MDT)

Merritt is a ghost town in Lawrence County and Pennington County, South Dakota, United States of America.

== History ==
Merritt was a small logging community that once included a school, post office, and a ranger station. It provided fuel and wood for the mines near Lead and Deadwood. It has since been abandoned. In the 1970s, all that remained of the town was a trout ranch.

== Geography ==
The old site is located on the county line between Pennington and Lawrence Counties in the US state of South Dakota, on the west side of US 385. Merritt is inside of the Black Hills. It was located at the southern end of the Black Hills & Fort Pierre Railroad. It was 18 miles north of Hill City. Its elevation is 5,105 feet (1,556 m).
