= Elk Range =

Elk Range may refer to:

- Elk Range (California)
- Elk Range (Canada)
