= Elk Township =

Elk Township may refer to the following places in the United States:

- Elk Township, Jackson County, Illinois
- Elk Township, Buena Vista County, Iowa
- Elk Township, Clayton County, Iowa
- Elk Township, Lake County, Michigan
- Elk Township, Sanilac County, Michigan
- Elk Township, Minnesota
- Elk Township, Stoddard County, Missouri
- Elk Township, Saunders County, Nebraska
- Elk Township, New Jersey
- Elk Township, Ashe County, North Carolina
- Elk Township, Noble County, Ohio
- Elk Township, Vinton County, Ohio
- Elk Township, Chester County, Pennsylvania
- Elk Township, Clarion County, Pennsylvania
- Elk Township, Tioga County, Pennsylvania
- Elk Township, Warren County, Pennsylvania

== See also ==
- Elkland Township (disambiguation)
- Elk (disambiguation) § Places
