= Elk Mountain (Nevada) =

Mountain in Nevada, United States

Coordinates: 41°57′46″N 115°03′42″W

Elk Mountain is a summit in Elko County in the U.S. state of Nevada. The elevation is 8,802 feet (2,683 m). The peak is in the northeastern portion of the Humboldt-Toiyabe National Forest about two miles south of the Nevada - Idaho border.

Elk Mountain was named for the elk which once roamed there.
