= Elkland Township =

Elkland Township may refer to the following places in the United States:

- Elkland Township, Michigan
- Elkland Township, Sullivan County, Pennsylvania

== See also ==
- Elk Township (disambiguation)
