= Ełk Narrow-gauge Railway =

Polish 750 mm gauge railway

Ełk Narrow Gauge Railway

Ełcka Kolej Wąskotorowa
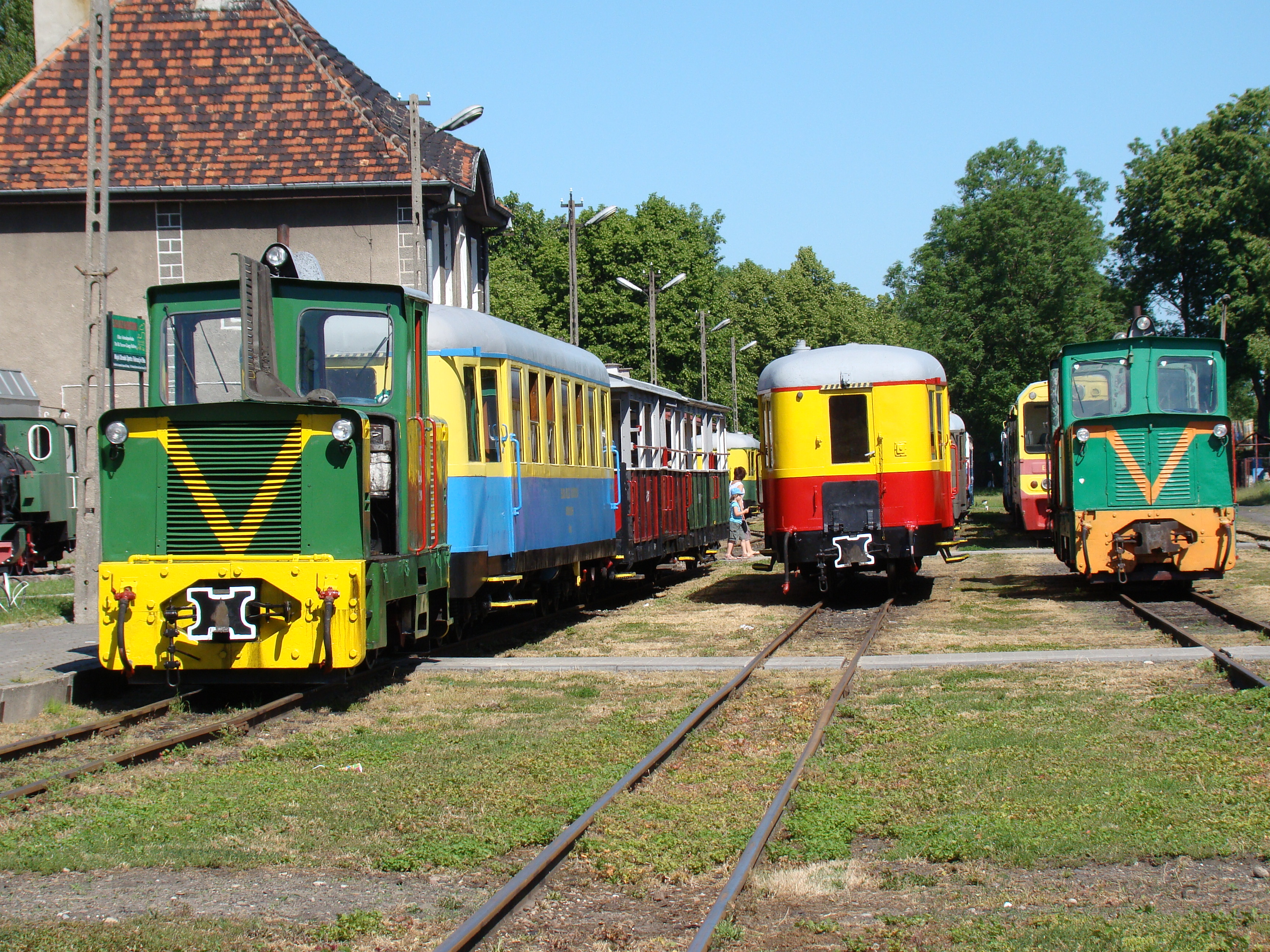
- Locale: Warmian–Masurian
- Terminus: Ełk

Preserved operations
- Preserved gauge: 750 mm

The Ełk Narrow-gauge Railway is a 750 mm gauge railway in Warmian–Masurian Voivodeship, Poland. It's associated with the Historical Museum in Ełk.

== Fleet ==
=== Steam Locomotives ===
- Px48-1752

=== Diesel Locomotives ===
- Lxd2-247
- Lyd1-203
- Lyd1-208
- Lyd1-212
- Lyd1-214

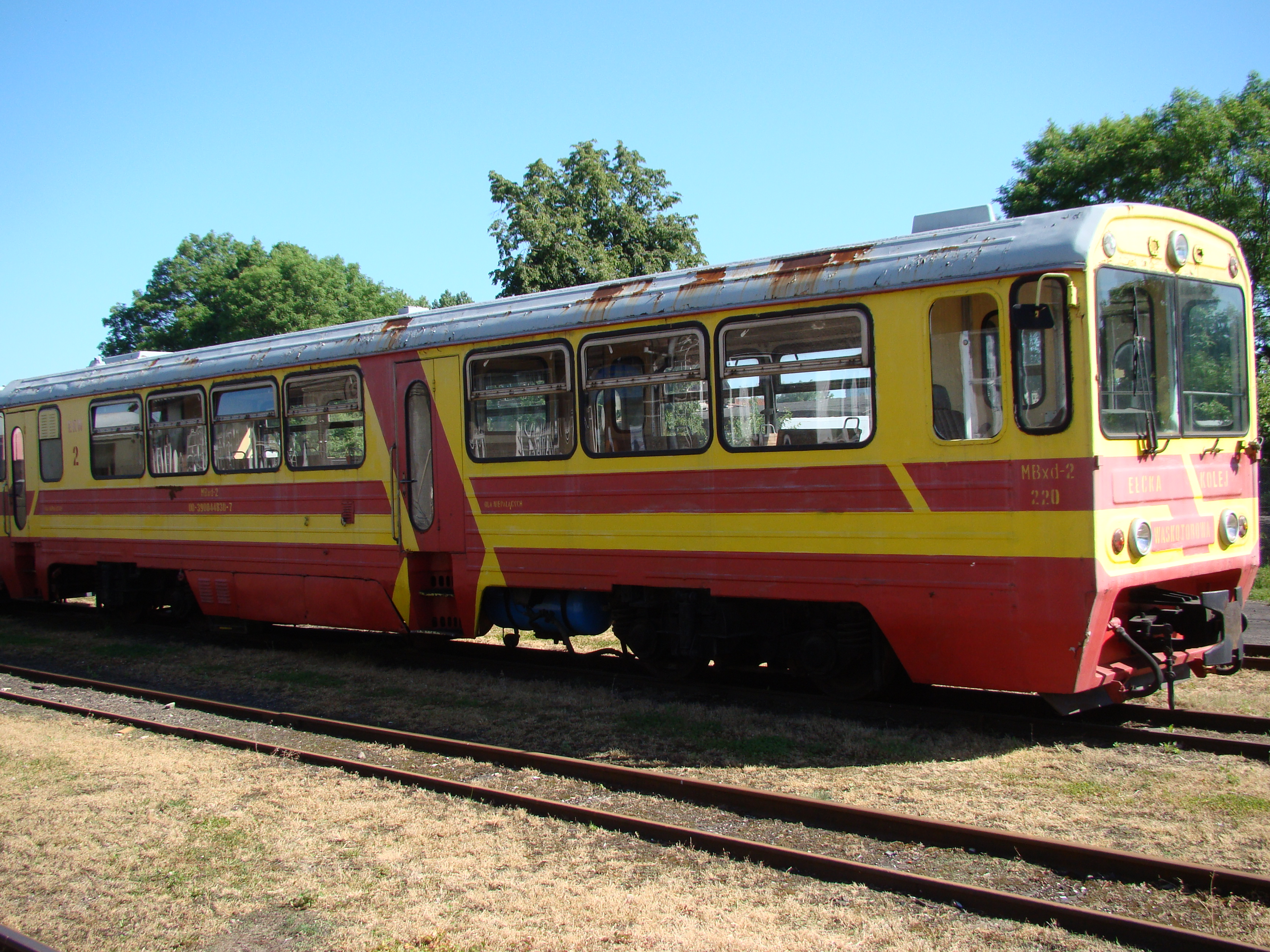

=== Diesel Railcars ===
- MBxd2-220
- MBd1-137
