= Elk Creek (Rock River tributary) =

Stream in Nobles and Rock County, Minnesota, U.S.

Coordinates: 43°35′48″N 96°11′18″W

Elk Creek is a stream in Nobles and Rock counties, in the U.S. state of Minnesota. It is a tributary of the Rock River.

Elk Creek was named for the fact elk were once frequently seen there.

== See also ==
- List of rivers of Minnesota
