= Elk County =

Elk County is the name of several places:

- Elk County, Kansas
- Elk County, Pennsylvania
- Ełk County, a county (powiat) in Poland
