= Elk (surname) =

Elk is a surname, derived from Native-American names whose multi-word translations into English end in "Elk".

Those bearing the surname include:

- Big Elk (c. 1765–1846), American Omaha leader
- John Elk (fl. 1880s), plaintiff in Elk v. Wilkins
- Black Elk (c. 1863–1950), American Oglala leader & author

== See also ==
- Anne Elk, fictional character in "Anne Elk's Theory on Brontosauruses", in a Monty Python episode
