= Burlington and Missouri River Railroad =

Former railway in the U.S.

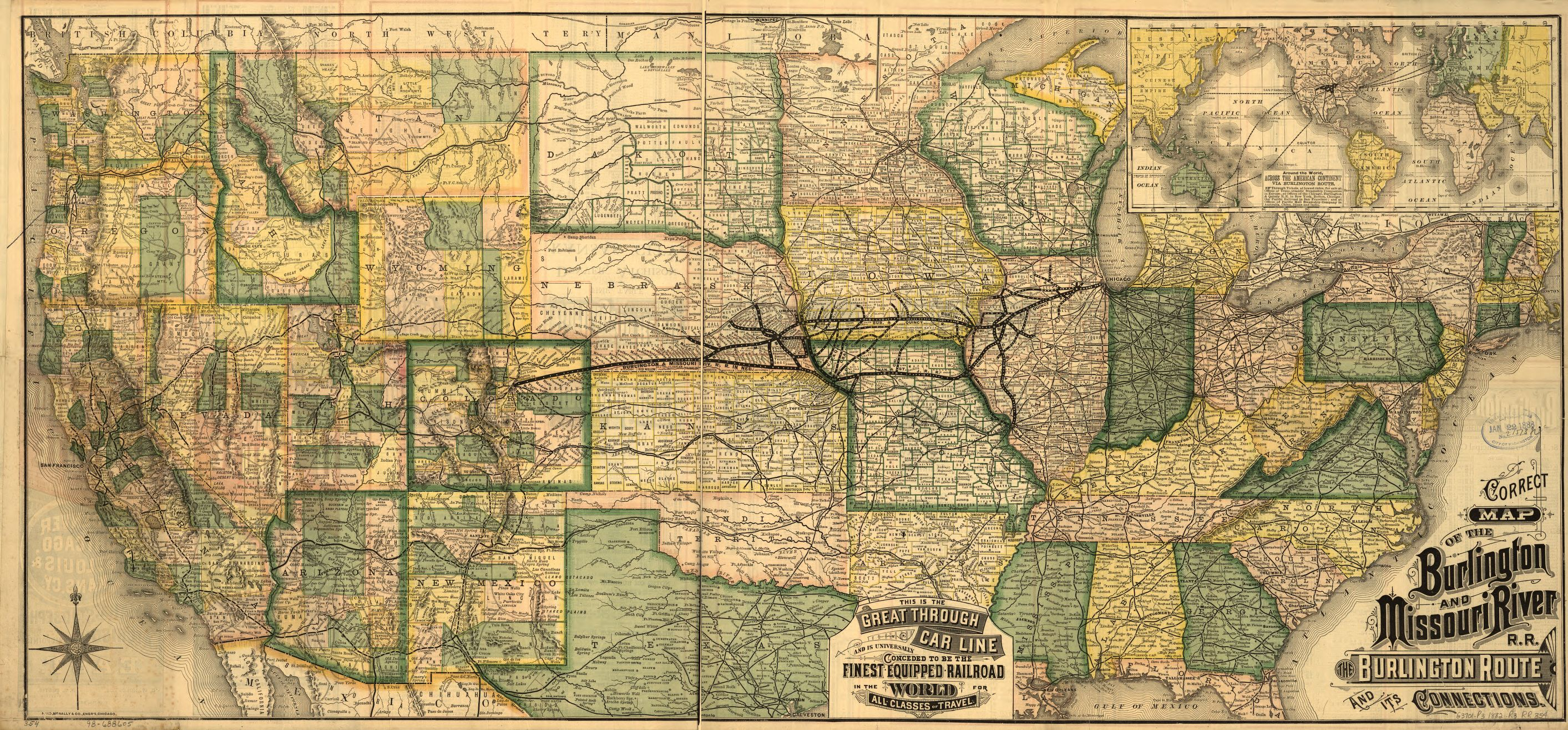
Burlington and Missouri River Railroad, 1882

The Burlington and Missouri River Railroad (B&MR) or sometimes (B&M) was an American railroad company incorporated in Iowa in 1852, with headquarters in Omaha, Nebraska. It was developed to build a railroad across the state of Iowa and began operations in 1856. The Iowa operations were leased to the Chicago, Burlington and Quincy Railroad on 31 December 1872, and kept serving as its subsidiary.

== History ==
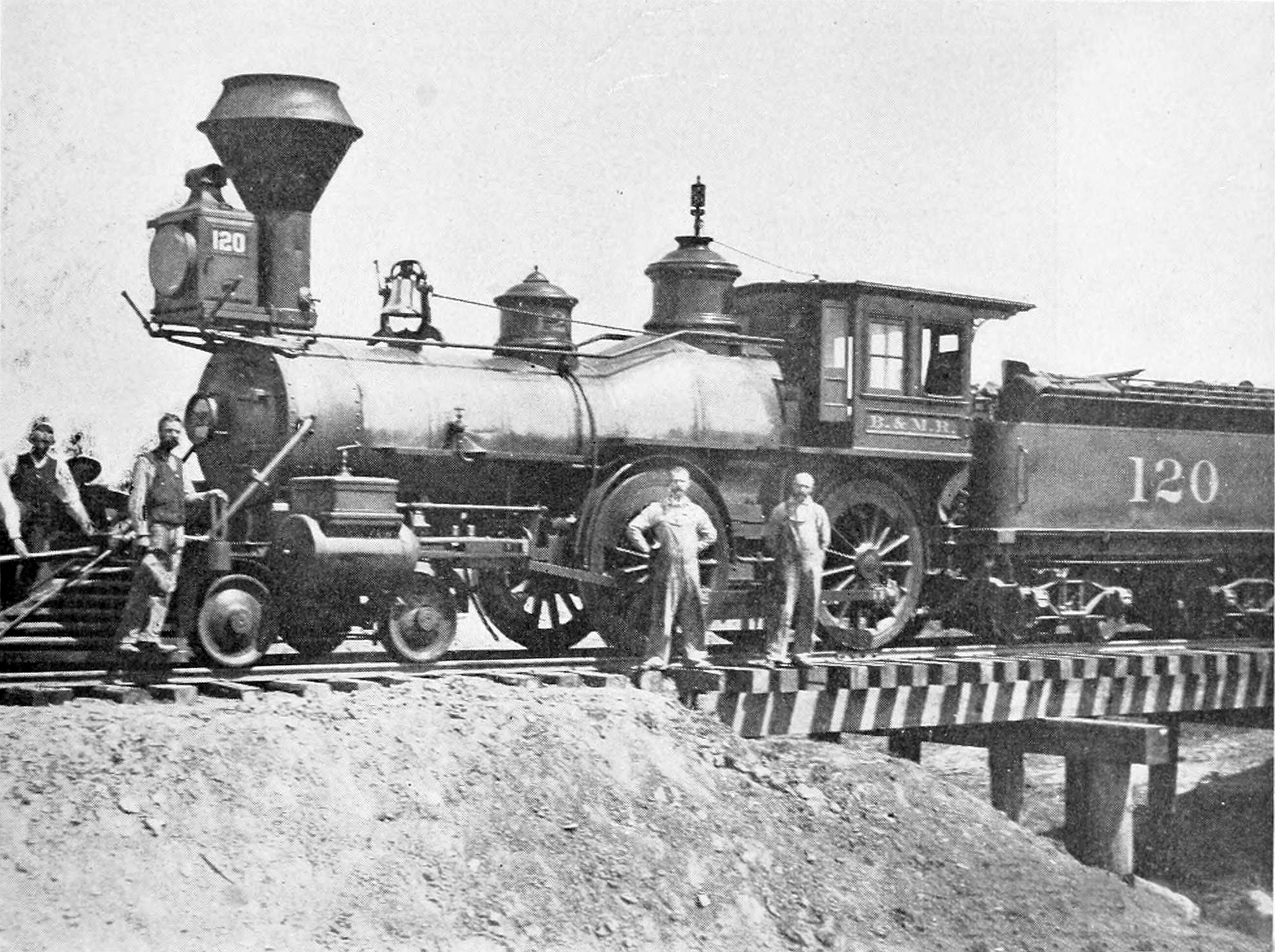
The first train to arrive in Broken Bow, Nebraska, August 26, 1886

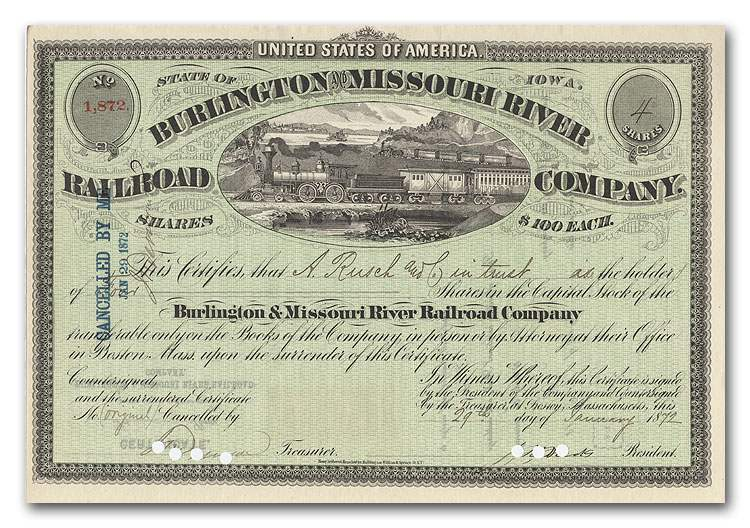
B&MR Stock certificate, cancelled 1872

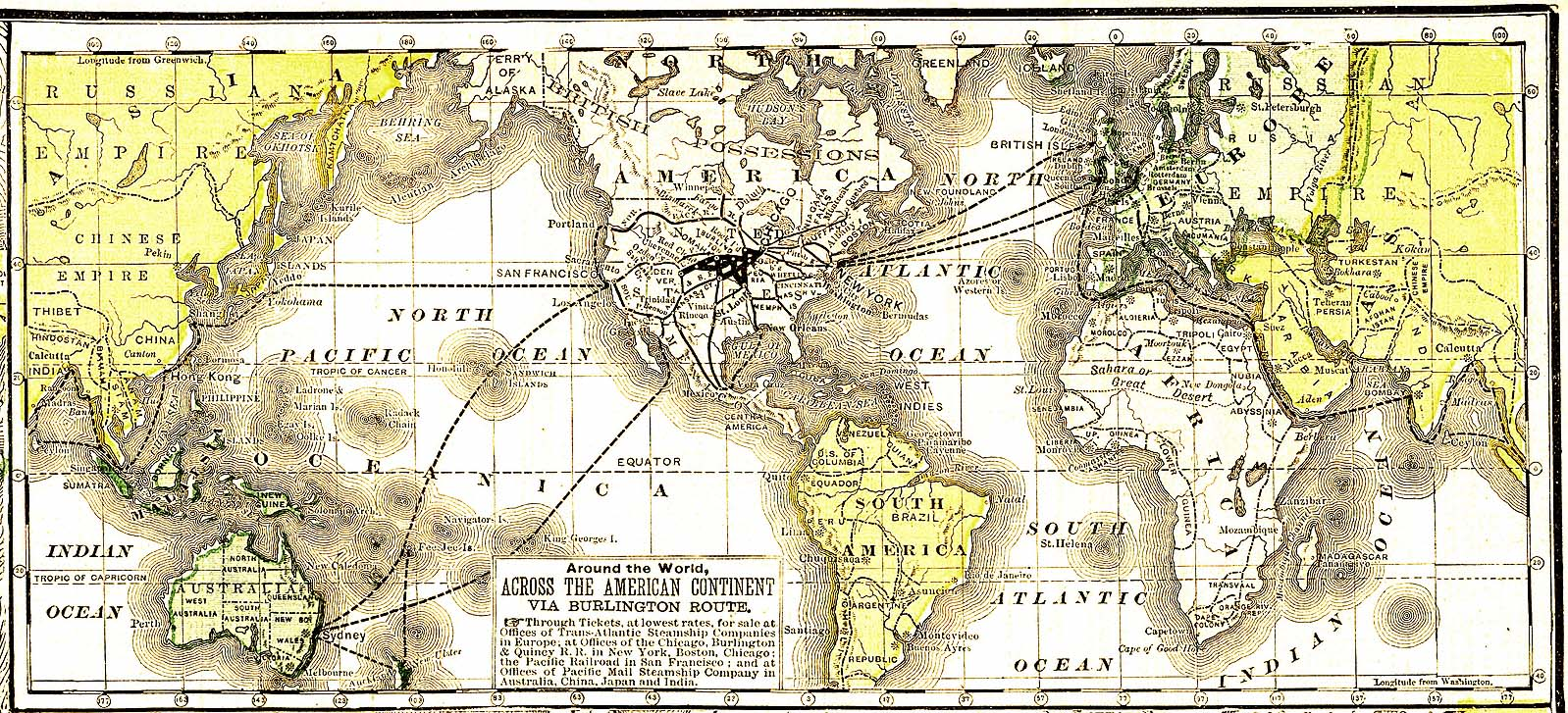
Map showing connections to harbors via the Burlington and Missouri River Railroad, 1888

The Burlington and Missouri River Railroad was incorporated in Burlington, Iowa in 1852. It commenced operations on January 1, 1856, with only a few miles of track. In 1857 it connected to Ottumwa, followed by Murray in 1868. It finally reached the Missouri River in November 1869. It used wood-burning locomotives and wooden passenger cars.

After the Chicago, Burlington and Quincy Railroad (CB&Q) finished a bridge crossing the Mississippi River at Burlington, it connected to the Burlington and Missouri River Railroad. By 1868 the Burlington and Missouri River Railroad operated 13 locomotives and 429 cars, mostly freight, with net earnings of $299,850 in 1867. After the interest on loans, this meant a total net profit of $6,749.

A sub-branch of the railroad was founded in Nebraska in 1869, with rails first entering the state in 1870 via Plattsmouth. That summer, the railroad reached Lincoln, the recently designated state capital. It later continued to lay rails westward and eventually joining with the Union Pacific Railroad on September 3, 1872, at Kearney; this linked traffic from southern Nebraska to the rest of the continent. That same year it began advertising "millions of acres of cheap land" as an incentive to prospective settlers to Iowa and Nebraska.

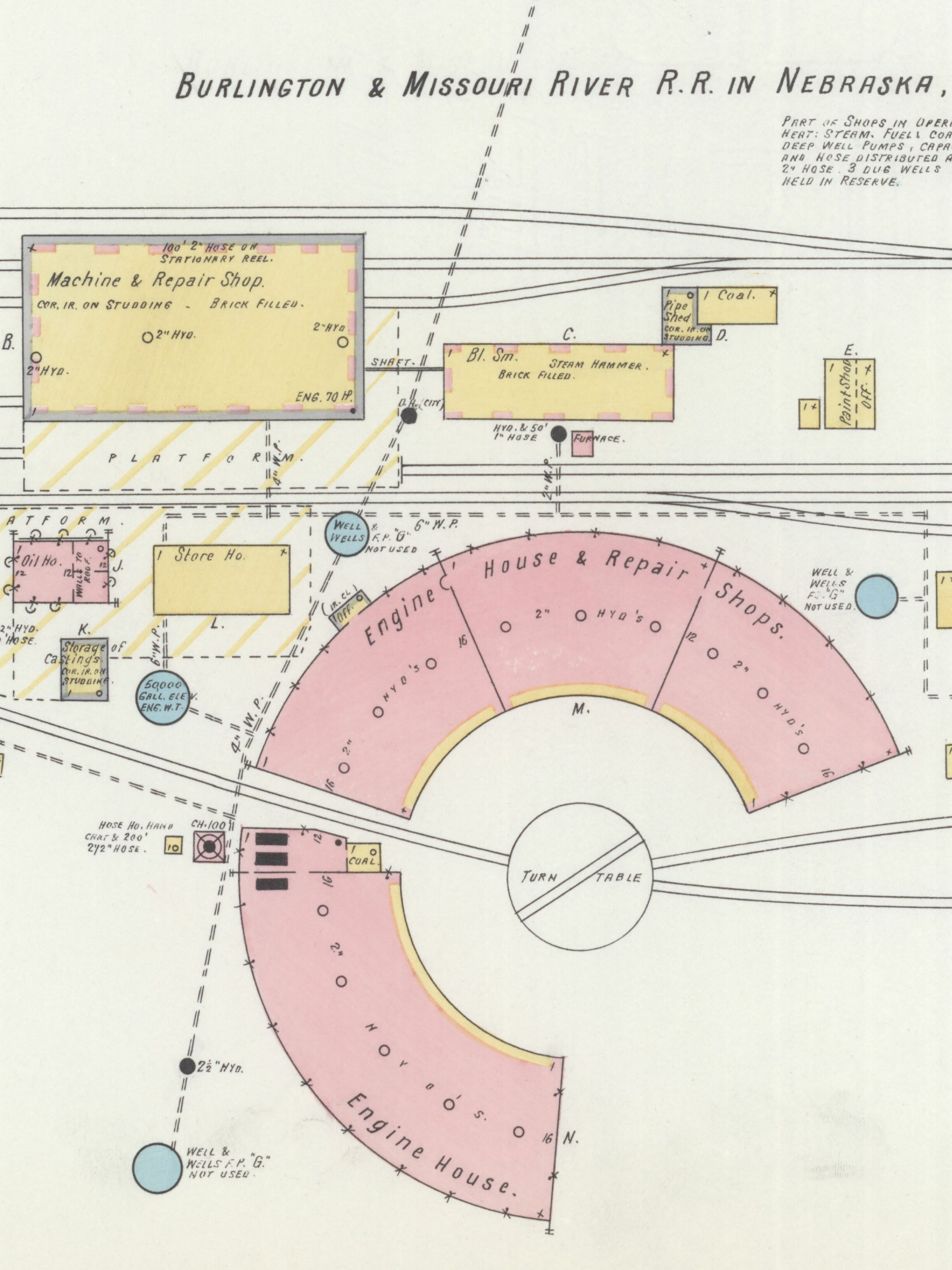
Burlington and Missouri River Railroad roundhouse and shop in 1903 map in Alliance, Nebraska

The Burlington and Missouri River Railroad of Iowa was acquired by the Chicago, Burlington and Quincy Railroad on 31 July 1875. At the time, it had begun laying tracks to Denver, Colorado; this line was finished by the CB&Q ten years later.

After being acquired by the Chicago, Burlington and Quincy Railroad, the Burlington and Missouri River Railroad served as its subsidiary, operating several lines in the Black Hills, including those acquired when Chicago, Burlington and Quincy Railroad took over the Black Hills and Fort Pierre Railroad in 1901.

== See also ==
- Railroads in Omaha
