= Elk River =

Elk River may refer to:

== Municipalities ==
- Elk River, California, a small community located at the edge of Eureka, California
- Elk River, former name of Elk, Mendocino County, California
- Elk River, Idaho
- Elk River, Minnesota

== Rivers and related topography ==
=== Canada ===
- Elk River (Alberta)
- Elk River (British Columbia)
- Elk River (Northwest Territories), see List of rivers of the Northwest Territories
- Elk River (Vancouver Island), on Vancouver Island, British Columbia
  - Elk River Mountains, on Vancouver Island, British Columbia, Canada

=== Poland ===
- Ełk River

=== United States ===
- Elk River (California)
- Elk River (Colorado)
- Elk River (Iowa)
- Elk River (Kansas)
- Elk River (Maryland)
- Elk River (Michigan)
- Elk River (Minnesota)
- Elk River (North Carolina–Tennessee)
- Elk River (Oklahoma), a stream in Oklahoma and Missouri
- Elk River (Oregon)
- Elk River (Tennessee)
- Elk River (Washington)
- Elk River (West Virginia)
