= Elk Creek (Loyalsock Creek tributary) =

Creek in Pennsylvania, US

Coordinates: 41.23481°N 76.94264°W

Elk Creek is an 11.4-mile-long (18.3 km) tributary of Loyalsock Creek in Sullivan County, Pennsylvania in the United States.

Elk Creek joins Loyalsock Creek several miles below Forksville.

== See also ==
- List of rivers of Pennsylvania
