= Elk, West Virginia =

Unincorporated community in West Virginia, United States

- Unincorporated community
- Location in West Virginia and the United States Elk (the United States)
- Coordinates: 38°21′39″N 81°39′55″W
- Country: United States
- State: West Virginia
- County: Kanawha
- Elevation: 614 ft (187 m)
- Time zone: UTC-5 (Eastern (EST))
  - Summer (DST): UTC-4 (EDT)
- GNIS ID: 1554380

Elk is an unincorporated community in Kanawha County, West Virginia, United States. The United States Geological Survey (USGS) lists its elevation at 610 feet (190 m).
