= Loring Air Force Base (CDP) =

- Former census-designated place
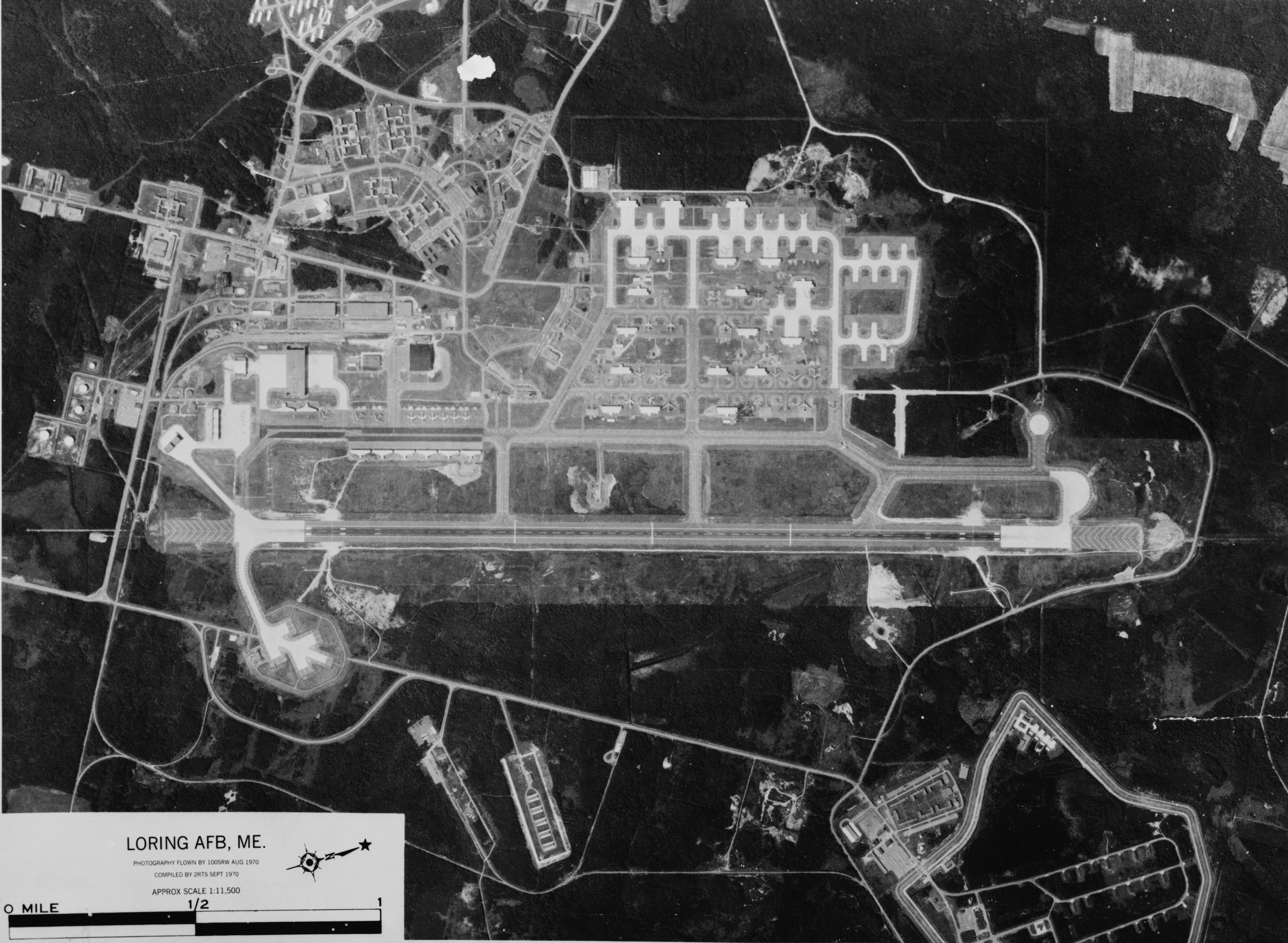
- The base in 1979
- Interactive map of Loring Air Force Base
- Coordinates: 46°56′59″N 67°53′2″W
- Country: United States
- State: Maine
- County: Aroostook

Area
  - Total: 8.2 sq mi (21.3 km^{2})
  - Land: 8.2 sq mi (21.2 km^{2})
  - Water: 0.039 sq mi (0.1 km^{2})
- Elevation: 746 ft (227.4 m)

Population (2000)
  - Total: 225
  - Density: 27/sq mi (10.6/km^{2})
- Time zone: UTC-5 (Eastern (EST))
  - Summer (DST): UTC-4 (EDT)
- ZIP code: 04750
- Area code: 207
- FIPS code: 23-41260

Loring Air Force Base is a former census-designated place (CDP) in the town of Limestone in Aroostook County, Maine, United States. It was the site of Loring Air Force Base, at one time the largest base for the U.S. Air Force's Strategic Air Command. The population of the CDP was 225 at the 2000 census. It was not counted during the 2010 census.

== Geography ==
The Loring Air Force Base CDP was located at 46°56′59″N 67°53′20″W.

According to the United States Census Bureau, the CDP had a total area of 8.2 mi^{2} (21.3 km^{2}). 8.2 mi^{2} (21.3 km^{2}) of it was land and 0.04 mi^{2} (0.1 km^{2}) of it (0.36%) was water.

== Demographics ==
Historical population
Census	Pop.	Note	%±
1970	6,266		—
1980	6,572		4.9%
1990	7,829		19.1%
2000	225		−97.1%

As of the census of 2000, there were 225 people, 82 households, and 57 families residing on the base. The population density was 27.4/mi^{2} (10.6/km^{2}). There were 355 housing units at an average density of 43.2/mi^{2} (16.7/km^{2}). The racial makeup of the base was 81.33% White, 10.22% African American, 2.22% Asian, 5.33% from other races, and 0.89% from two or more races. Hispanic or Latino of any race were 13.78% of the population.

There were 82 households, out of which 53.7% had children under the age of 18 living with them, 54.9% were married couples living together, 11.0% had a female householder with no husband present, and 29.3% were non-families. 28.0% of all households were made up of individuals, and 1.2% had someone living alone who was 65 years of age or older. The average household size was 2.74 and the average family size was 3.38.

On the base the population was spread out, with 37.3% under the age of 18, 5.3% from 18 to 24, 43.6% from 25 to 44, 10.7% from 45 to 64, and 3.1% who were 65 years of age or older. The median age was 29 years. For every 100 females, there were 90.7 males. For every 100 females age 18 and over, there were 93.2 males.

The median income for a household on the base was $36,667, and the median income for a family was $39,844. Males had a median income of $33,125 versus $25,724 for females. The per capita income on the base was $19,888. None of the families and 5.0% of the population were below the poverty line, including none of those under the age of 18 or ages 65 and older.
