= Elk Mountain (British Columbia) =

Mountain in British Columbia, Canada

Coordinates: 49°6′48.09″N 121°48′12.20″W

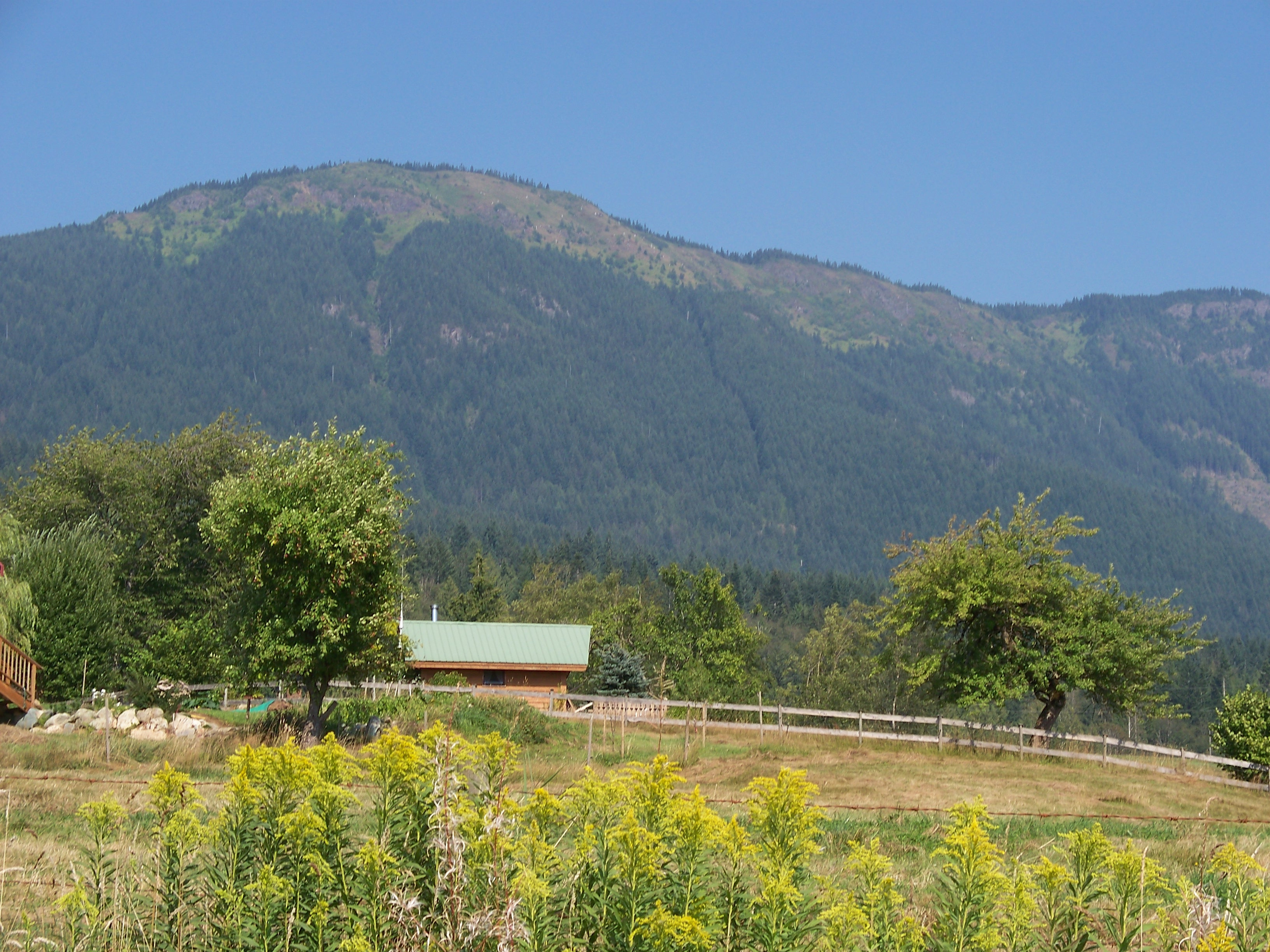
Elk Mountain as seen from Ryder Lake, Chilliwack.

Elk Mountain is located within the Fraser Valley in South Western British Columbia. It is part of the Cascade mountain range. Its highest point reaches up to 1,432 m. It is often frequented by paragliders.

== Hiking Trail ==
A popular 4 km (one-way) hiking trail called the Elk-Thurston trail allows access to the summit. This trail gains 640 m of elevation from the trailhead to the summit. The trail continues on to Mount Thurston, 3.5 km further along the trail and another 198 m higher. The trail continues to Mt Mercer, and it is possible to trek all the way to Mt Cheam.
