= Elkhorn Mountains (disambiguation) =

Elkhorn Mountains may refer to:

- Elkhorn Mountains in Montana
- Elkhorn Mountains (Oregon), a subrange of the Blue Mountains
