= Elk Creek (Gasconade River tributary) =

River in Missouri, United States

Location
- Country: United States
- State: Missouri
- Region: Wright County

Physical characteristics
- Source
  - coordinates: 37°20′59″N 92°33′23″W
  - elevation: 1,480 ft (450 m)
- Mouth
  - coordinates: 37°27′34″N 92°25′21″W
  - elevation: 1,001 ft (305 m)

Elk Creek is a stream in central to northeast Wright County, Missouri. It is a tributary of the Gasconade River.

The stream headwaters arise some eight miles north-northwest of Hartville between the communities of Loring and Durbin. The stream flows to the north and northeast passing under routes H and Z to its confluence with the Gasconade in northern Wright County about 1.5 miles southeast of Competition in southern Laclede County.

Elk Creek was because of elk in the area.

== See also ==
- List of rivers of Missouri
