= Elko (surname) =

Elko is a surname. Notable people with the surname include:

- Bill Elko (born 1959), American football player
- Mike Elko (born 1977), American football coach
- Nicholas Elko (1909–1991), American bishop
- Tim Elko (born 1998), American baseball player
