= Elk Creek (Kansas) =

Stream in Bourbon and Linn County, Kansas, U.S.

Coordinates: 38.021424°N 94.771906°W

Elk Creek is a stream in Bourbon and Linn counties, in the U.S. state of Kansas.

Elk Creek was named for the elk seen there by early settlers.

== See also ==
- List of rivers of Kansas
