= Elk (Milwaukee sculpture) =

Sculpture, created 1901

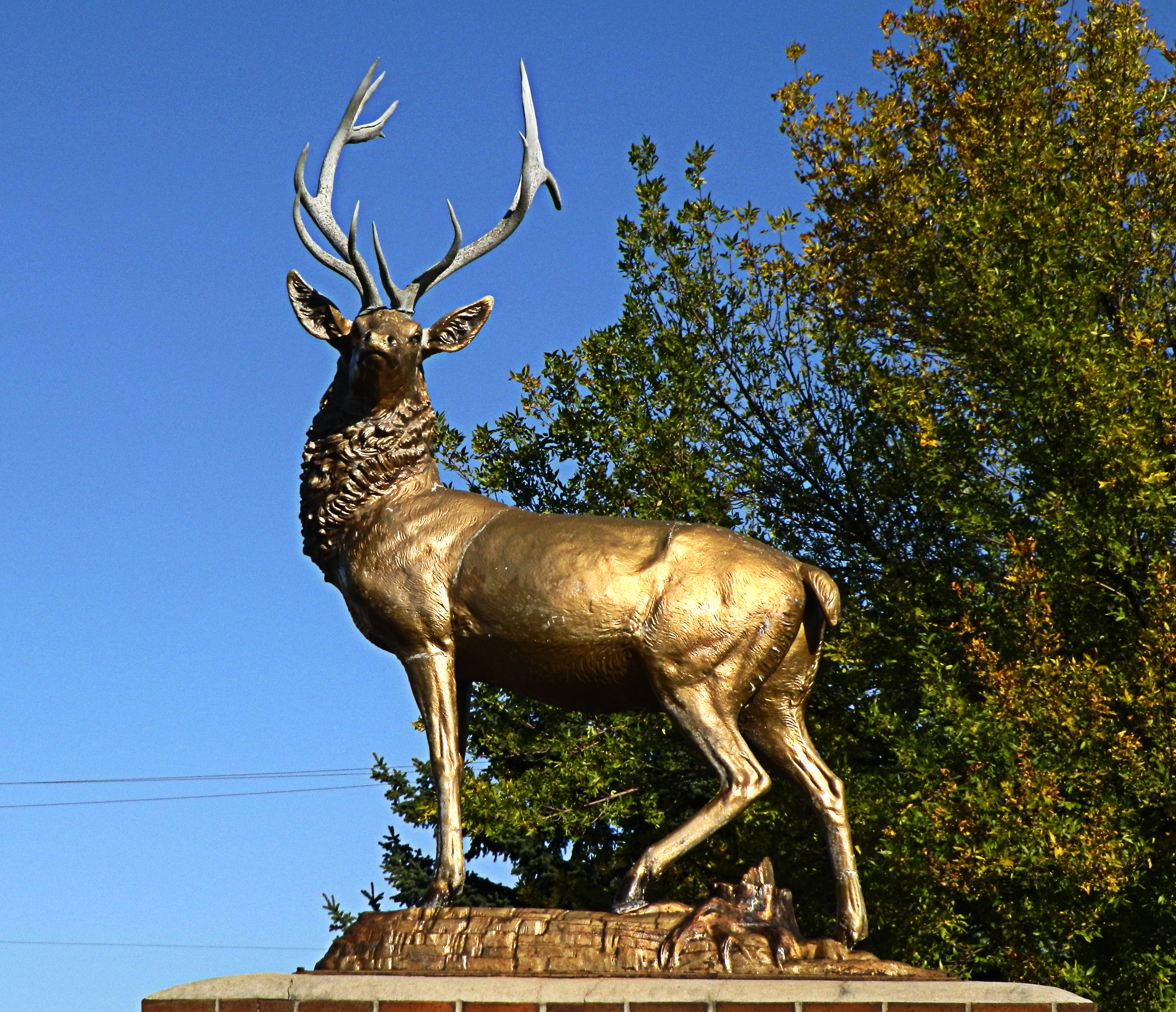
- Artist: Unknown
- Year: 1901
- Dimensions: 230 cm (90 in)
- Location: Milwaukee; 43°8′54.039″N 87°58′51.851″W
- Owner: Benevolent Protective Order of Elks, Milwaukee Lodge (No. 46)

Elk is a public artwork by an unknown artist located in front of the Benevolent and Protective Order of Elks, Milwaukee Lodge 46, which is on the Northwest side of Milwaukee, Wisconsin, United States. The zinc sculpture depicts a 7'6" tall elk atop a brick pedestal announcing the club's events.

== Description ==
The Elk sculpture in front of the Benevolent and Protective Order of Elks, Milwaukee Lodge portrays an elk made out of zinc painted gold and brown. The elk stands erect with his head turned 10 degrees to the proper left. His front legs are straight and parallel, while his proper left hind foot is in front of his proper right leg. The sculpture's base depicts a forest floor, including a small broken tree stump on the proper left. The sculpture stands on a brick base that displays advertisements for the lodge. There is a plaque on the base with the Elks Lodge logo.

== Historical information ==
The Benevolent and Protective Order of the Elks, established in 1868, has almost a million members and more than 2000 lodges all over the country. "In the early twentieth century, the Benevolent and Protective Order of the Elks commissioned artists, mostly on the east coast, to create statues of elks for fountains in cities across the United States." These images were made available to the new chapters of the Elks. The Milwaukee Lodge of Elks (No. 46) decided to present an elk statue and fountain to the community in 1901, the year that the Elks of America held their Grand Lodge convention in Milwaukee. The statue they chose is a replica of one in Reading, Pennsylvania cast by the Fish Manufacturing Company. It was presented to the community as part of the Elks Carnival Parade on July 23, 1901. In 1927 the Milwaukee Elks built a new lodge, called the Wonder Lodge, at 910 East Wisconsin Avenue. The sculpture was placed in front of the building on a pedestal designed by Ruben F. Clas. "Natural spring water from a well in the basement of the lodge was connected to the base of the statue; along with city water, it flowed from two taps at the elk's base."

=== Location history ===
The Wonder Lodge was razed in 1971. The Elk was salvaged and now resides in front of the current clubhouse on West Good Hope Road in Milwaukee, Wisconsin. It was restored and sits atop a brick pedestal that lists the club's upcoming events.

== Condition ==
The sculpture has been vandalized in the past. For example, the elk's antlers were removed. They were subsequently substituted for a pair of real antlers.
