= Elk Range (California) =

Mountain range in California, United States

- Location within California

Highest point
- Elevation: 377 m (1,237 ft)

Geography
- Country: United States
- State: California
- District: Mendocino County
- Range coordinates: 38°50′38.660″N 123°9′54.018″W
- Topo map: USGS Big Foot Mountain

The Elk Range is a mountain range in Mendocino County, California in the United States.
