= Elk Creek (Turkey River tributary) =

Stream in Clayton and Delaware County, Iowa, U.S.

Coordinates: 42.738044°N 91.269299°W

Elk Creek is a stream in Clayton County, Iowa and Delaware County, Iowa, in the United States. It is a tributary of the Turkey River.

Elk Creek was so named in 1834 when a pioneer saw a herd of elk there.

== See also ==
- List of rivers of Iowa
