= Elk Creek (South Dakota) =

Stream in South Dakota, U.S.

Coordinates: 44°15′12″N 102°21′35″W

Elk Creek is a stream in the U.S. state of South Dakota.

Elk Creek was named for the elk pioneer settlers saw near the stream.

== See also ==
- List of rivers of South Dakota
