= Loring, Missouri =

Extinct hamlet in Missouri, U.S.

Coordinates: 37°20′41″N 92°34′29″W

Loring is an extinct town in Wright County, in the U.S. state of Missouri. The GNIS classifies it as a populated place. The community is located just east of Missouri Route 5 between Hartville and Grovespring. It is near the headwaters of Steins Creek.

A post office called Loring was established in 1905, and remained in operation until 1954. The community has the name of the local Loring family.
