= Elk Mountain (Routt County, Colorado) =

Mountain in Colorado, United States

- The Sleeping Giant
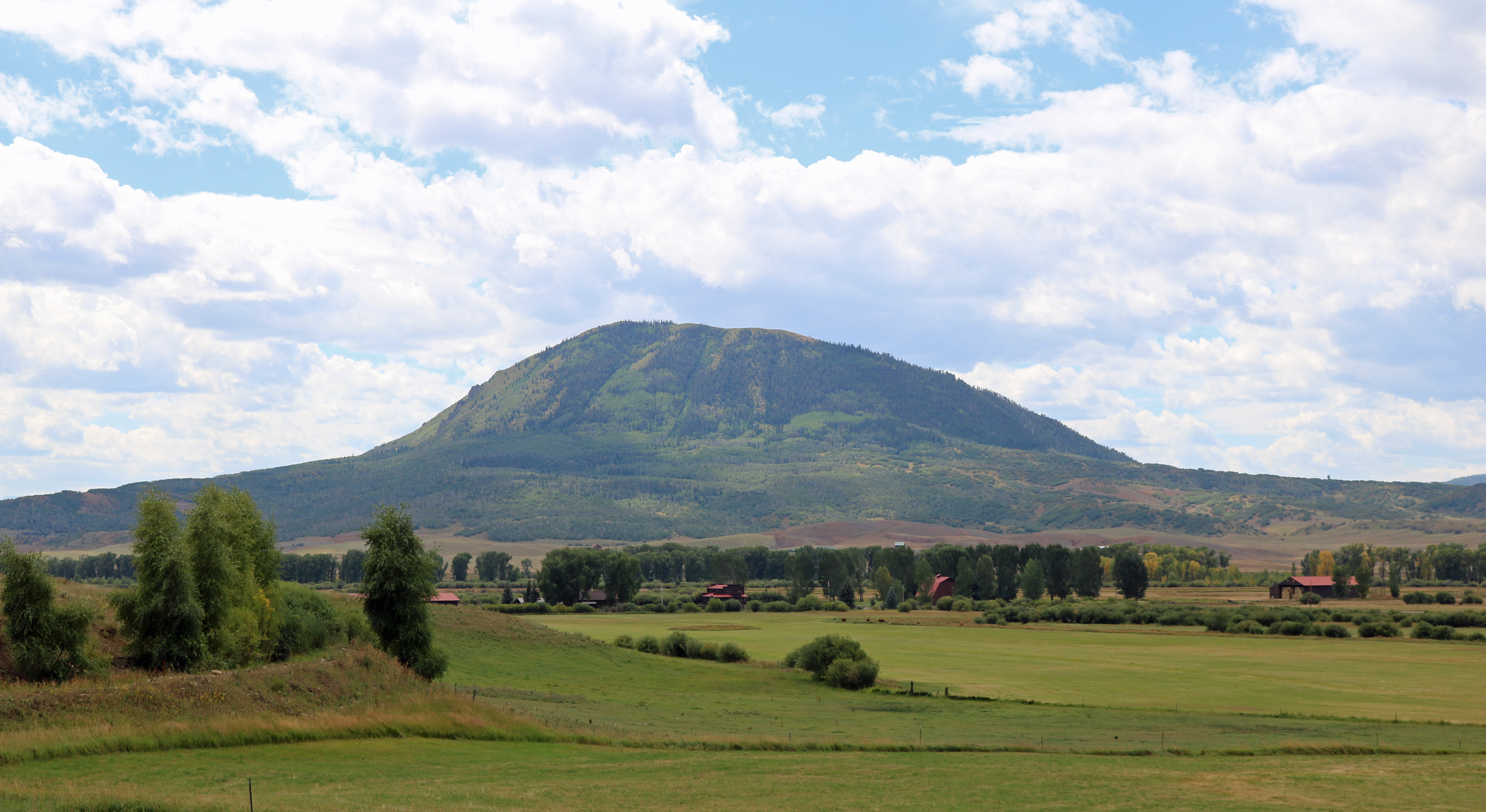
- The mountain as seen from Routt County Road 129.

Highest point
- Elevation: 8,727 ft (2,660 m)
- Prominence: 1,664 ft (507 m)
- Isolation: 12.77 mi (20.55 km)
- Coordinates: 40°34′09″N 106°58′06″W

Geography
- Location within Colorado
- Location: Routt County, Colorado
- Parent range: Elkhead Mountains
- Topo map: Mad Creek

Elk Mountain is a summit in Routt County, Colorado. The mountain lies to the northwest of Steamboat Springs and is easily seen from the city, especially from along Lincoln Avenue (U.S. Route 40), Steamboat's main street. The mountain is also easily seen from Mount Werner, the home of the Steamboat Ski Resort.

The Elk River flows near the mountain just before its confluence with the Yampa River in the Yampa Valley.

== Legends and names ==
Locals refer to the mountain as "The Sleeping Giant," due to its resemblance to the profile of a prone person at sleep when viewed from Mount Werner or Steamboat Springs, and have created legends to explain this appearance.

There are at least six other summits also named Elk Mountain in Colorado. This Elk Mountain in Routt County is not part of the Elk Mountains in West Central Colorado. Instead, it is one of the easternmost peaks in the Elkhead Mountains.
