= List of ethnic riots =

Violent public disturbances between differently self-identifying groups

This is a list of ethnic riots by country, and includes riots based on ethnic, sectarian, xenophobic, and racial conflict. Some of these riots can also be classified as pogroms.

== Africa ==
Country	Riot	Notes	References
Algeria	1898 Algerian riots		
Algeria	1961 Rosh Hashanah Anti-Arab Riots	Jewish mobs massacre Arabs in Oran	
Burundi	1972 Ikiza tragedy		
Burundi	1993 ethnic violence in Burundi		
Egypt	1945 Anti-Jewish riots in Egypt		
Ghana	see: Ethnic conflict in Ghana		
Ivory Coast	2004 French–Ivorian clashes		
Kenya (see: Ethnic conflicts in Kenya)	Somali–Kenyan conflict		
Kenya (see: Ethnic conflicts in Kenya)	2012 Baragoi clashes		
Kenya (see: Ethnic conflicts in Kenya)	2012–13 Tana River District clashes		
Lesotho	2007 Anti-Chinese riot in Maseru in Maseru		
Libya	1945 Anti-Jewish riots in Tripolitania		
Libya	1948 Anti-Jewish riots in Tripolitania		
Libya	1967 Tripoli pogrom		
Mauritania	1989 race riots in Mauritania	Riots took place during Mauritania–Senegal Border War	
Morocco	1912 Fez riots		
Morocco	1948 anti-Jewish riots in Oujda and Jerada		
Mauritius	1906 Pagoda riots		
Mauritius	1911 Curepipe riots		
Mauritius	1937 Uba riots		
Mauritius	1943 Belle Vue Harel Massacre		
Mauritius	1965 Mauritius race riots		
Mauritius	1968 Mauritian riots		
Mauritius	1999 Mauritian riots		
Mauritius	1999 L'Amicale riots		
Nigeria	1966 anti-Igbo pogrom		
South Africa	1949 Anti-Indian riots in Durban	These riots, taking place between 13–14 January 1949, were a pogrom in which Indians were targeted, predominantly by Zulus. In total 142 Asians died and another 1,087 people were injured; the riot resulted in the massacre of mostly poor Indians. It also led to the destruction of 58 shops, 247 dwellings, and one factory.	
South Africa	1976 Soweto uprising		
South Africa	1985 Anti-Indian riot in Durban	This riot came as Zulu youth spilled into Asian suburbs of Durban (including Inanda) during the night. While this event was less severe in its intensity and of much shorter duration than the 1949 riots, this riot also saw hundreds of South-African Indians families fleeing their neighbourhoods in order to escape Zulu rioters who looted and torched their homes on the night of 7 August 1985.	
South Africa	2007 Anti-Somali riot in Port Elizabeth		
South Africa	2020 riot in Senekal	Protests in response to the killing of Brendin Horner turned violent. Rioters, largely Boers, stormed the courthouse where the two perpetrators were being held. Gunfire was exchanged, and a police van outside was turned over and set alight.	
Tanzania	1964 Zanzibar Revolution	Took place on 12 January 1964.	
Tunisia	1941 anti-Jewish riots in Gabès		

== Americas ==
Country	Riot	Notes	References
Brazil	1823 Anti-Portuguese riots in Rio de Janeiro		
Brazil	1831 Anti-Portuguese riots in Salvador		
Canada	1784 Shelburne riots in Nova Scotia	These riots took place in July 1784 by landless white Loyalist veterans of the American War of Independence against Black Loyalists and government officials in the Nova Scotian town of Shelburne, and the nearby village of Birchtown. They are considered the first race riots in Canada, and are one of the earliest recorded race riots in North America.	
Canada	1835–45 Shiners' War		
Canada	1847 Woodstock riot	Riot between Catholics and members of the Orange Order in Woodstock, New Brunswick, that resulted in the deaths of up to ten people.	
Canada	Riot over a black person taking up a military uniform in 1852 in St. Catharines, Ontario.		
Canada	Riot over a black man marrying a white woman in 1860 in Chatham, Ontario.		
Canada	Riot over a blacks sitting in the main theatre section in 1860 in Victoria, British Columbia.		
Canada	1863 Oil Springs riot		
Canada	1875 Jubilee riots in Toronto		
Canada	1886 Vancouver anti-Chinese riots	Also known as the Winter Riots.	
Canada	Anti-Chinese riot in 1892 due to a small-pox outbreak, (Calgary, Alberta)		
Canada	Anti-Chinese riot in 1907 due to an altercation between a Chinese employee and a white customer, (Lethbridge, Alberta)		
Canada	1907 Anti-Oriental riots in Vancouver	As part of the larger anti-Asian Pacific Coast race riots of 1907, along the west coast of Canada and the US.	
Canada	Anti-German riots in reaction to World War I in 1916, (Calgary, Alberta)		
Canada	1918 Toronto anti-Greek riot		
Canada	Anti-Chinese riot in 1919, (Halifax, Nova Scotia)		
Canada	Anti-immigrant riot in 1919, (Winnipeg, Manitoba)		
Canada	1933 Christie Pits riot in Toronto		
Canada	Anti-black riot in 1940, (Calgary, Alberta)		
Canada	1969 Sir George Williams affair		
Canada	1990 Oka Crisis		
Canada	Riot by blacks against white-owned businesses in response to perceived discrimination against them in 1991, (Halifax, Nova Scotia)		
Canada	1992 Yonge Street riot in Toronto	Rioting by black protestors in response to the Rodney King verdict and another black victim of police brutality.	
Canada	1999 Burnt Church Crisis		
Canada	2020 Mi'kmaq lobster dispute		
Mexico	1911 Torreón massacre		
Peru	1880s anti-Chinese riots	Peruvians held the Chinese as responsible for Chile's invasion during the War of the Pacific, due to Chinese support for Chile throughout the war. This would stem a sense of sinophobia among Peruvians, the first of its kind in Latin America. In the Cañete region, Chinese immigrants were massacred by Afro-Peruvian peasants, led by women during the War of the Pacific. Following the war, Chinese were further targeted and murdered by native Peruvians. In the central Sierra, armed indigenous peasants sacked and occupied the haciendas of landed elite Criollo 'collaborationists', a majority of whom were of ethnic-Chinese descent. In Lima, Indigenous and mestizo Peruvians murdered Chinese shopkeepers. In response, Chinese coolies revolted, some even joining the Chilean Army. It was not until 1890s that anti-Chinese pogroms ended in Peru.	
Peru	1880s Indigenous uprising against white Peruvians		

=== United States ===
==== Nativist period: 1700s–1860 ====
- 1824: Providence, RI – Hard Scrabble Riots
- 1829: Cincinnati, OH – Cincinnati riots of 1829
- 1831: Providence, RI - Hard Scrabble and Snow Town
- 1834: Ursuline Convent riots in Charlestown, Massachusetts – Convent burned to the ground
- 1834: Philadelphia, PA – pro-slavery riots
- 1834: New York, NY – New York City pro-slavery riots
- 1835: Boston, MA – pro-slavery riots
- 1835: Five Points Riot - "In June of the summer of 1835 occurred the Five Points riot, which grew out of the feeling between Americans and foreigners,"
- 1835: Washington, D.C. – Snow Riot
- 1836: Cincinnati, OH – Cincinnati riots of 1836
- 1841: Cincinnati, OH – Cincinnati riots of 1841 White Irish-descendant and Irish immigrant dock workers rioted against black dock workers.
- 1844: Philadelphia, PA – Philadelphia Nativist Riots
- 1851: Hoboken, NJ – anti-German riot
- 1855: Louisville, KY – "Bloody Monday" Protestant mobs attacked German and Irish immigrants.

==== Reconstruction era: 1865–1877 ====
- 1866: New Orleans massacre of 1866
- 1866: Memphis, Tennessee, mostly ethnic Irish against African Americans
- 1868: Pulaski riot
- 1868: St. Bernard Parish massacre, St. Bernard Parish, Louisiana, whites against blacks
- 1868: Opelousas massacre, Opelousas, Louisiana, whites against blacks
- 1868: Camilla massacre, Camilla, Georgia, whites against blacks
- 1870: Eutaw massacre, Eutaw, Alabama, whites against blacks
- 1870: Laurens, South Carolina
- 1870: New York City Orange Riot
- 1871: Second New York City Orange Riot
- 1871: Los Angeles, Chinese massacre. Mixed Mexican and white mob killed 17–20 Chinese in the largest mass lynching in U.S. history
- 1871: Meridian race riot of 1871, Meridian, Mississippi, whites against African Americans
- 1891: New Orleans, lynchings of Italians and riot
- 1873: Colfax massacre, white Democrats against black Republicans
- 1874: New Orleans, Louisiana (Battle of Liberty Place) After contested gubernatorial election, Democrats took over state buildings for three days
- 1874: Coushatta massacre, Coushatta, Louisiana, white Democrats against black Republicans
- 1874: Election Massacre of 1874
- 1874–1875: Vicksburg massacre, Vicksburg, Mississippi
- 1875: Yazoo City, Mississippi
- 1875: Clinton, Mississippi
- 1876: Hamburg massacre
- 1876: Ellenton massacre, Ellenton, South Carolina

==== Jim Crow era: 1878–1914 ====
- 1885: Rock Springs, WY – Anti-Chinese riot
- 1886: Seattle, WA – Seattle riot of 1886
- 1889: Forrest City, AR – 1889 Forrest City riot
- 1891: New Orleans, LA – March 14, 1891 New Orleans lynchings
- 1898: North Carolina – Wilmington massacre (white Democrats overthrew elected government and attacked blacks)
- 1898: Lake City, SC – Lynching of Frazier B. Baker and Julia Baker
- 1898: Greenwood County, SC – Phoenix election riot
- 1900: New Orleans, LA – Robert Charles riots
- 1900: Manhattan, NY – Tenderloin anti-black mob and police riot
- 1904: Springfield, OH – Springfield race riot of 1904
- 1906: Springfield, OH – Springfield race riot of 1906
- 1906: Atlanta, GA – Atlanta Massacre of 1906 (whites against African Americans)
- 1906: Brownsville, TX – Brownsville affair
- 1907: Onancock, VA – Two buildings owned by black residents were burned, black residents were ordered to leave town, and some people were injured by gunfire.
- 1907: San Francisco, CA and Bellingham, WA – Pacific Coast race riots of 1907 (anti-Asian)
- 1908: Springfield, IL – Springfield race riot of 1908
- 1909: Omaha, NE – Greek Town riot
- 1910: Nationwide – Johnson–Jeffries riots (anti-black riots following the heavyweight championship victory of Jack Johnson against Jim Jeffries)
- 1910: Slocum, TX – Slocum massacre

==== War and interwar period: 1914–1945 ====
- 1917: East St. Louis, IL – East St. Louis riots
- 1917: Chester, PA – 1917 Chester race riot
- 1917: Philadelphia, PA - South Philadelphia Sugar Refinery Riot and The South Philadelphia Food Riots of 1917.
- 1917: El Paso, TX – 1917 Bath riots
- 1917: Houston, TX – Houston riot
- 1919: Red Summer
  - Washington, D.C.
  - Chicago race riot of 1919
  - Omaha race riot of 1919
  - Charleston riot of 1919
  - Longview race riot
  - Knoxville riot of 1919
  - Elaine massacre
- 1920: Ocoee, FL – Ocoee massacre
- 1921: Tulsa, OK – Tulsa race massacre
- 1921: Springfield, OH – Springfield race riot of 1921
- 1923: Rosewood, FL – Rosewood massacre
- 1927: Yakima Valley, WA – Yakima Valley riots (anti-Filipino)
- 1928: Wenatchee Valley – Wenatchee Valley anti-Filipino riot
- 1929: Exeter, CA – Exeter anti-Filipino riot
- 1930: Watsonville, CA – Watsonville riots (anti-Filipino riot that inspired further riots and attacks in San Francisco, Salinas, San Jose, and elsewhere).
- 1935: New York, NY – Harlem riot of 1935
- 1943: Detroit, MI – Detroit race riot
- 1943: Beaumont, TX – Beaumont race riot of 1943
- 1943: New York, NY – Harlem riot of 1943
- 1943: Los Angeles, CA – Zoot Suit Riots (white against Mexican Americans and other Zoot suit wearers)
- 1944: Agana, Guam – Agana race riot

==== Postwar era: 1946–1954 ====
- 1946: Airport Homes race riots (series) Airport Homes race riots
- 1946: Columbia, TN – Columbia race riot of 1946
- 1949: Cortlandt Manor, NY – Peekskill riots (anti-communist race riots against Jews and African Americans)
- 1951: Cicero, IL – Cicero race riot

==== Civil rights and Black Power period: 1955–1977 ====
- 1958: Maxton, NC – Battle of Hayes Pond
- 1962: Oxford, MS – Ole Miss riot
- 1963: Birmingham, AL – Birmingham Riot of 1963
- 1963: Cambridge, MD – Cambridge riot of 1963
- 1963: Lexington, NC – Lexington riot
- 1964: Harlem, NY – Harlem Riot of 1964
- 1964: Rochester, NY – Rochester riot
- 1964: North Philadelphia, PA – Philadelphia 1964 race riot
- 1965: Los Angeles, CA – Watts Riots
- 1966: Humboldt Park, Chicago, IL – Division Street riots
- 1966: Cleveland, OH – Hough Riots
- 1966: Omaha, NE – North Omaha summer riots
- 1966: Dayton, Ohio – 1966 Dayton race riot
- 1967: Long Hot Summer of 1967
  - June 2: Boston riot (Boston, MA)
  - June 11 – 14: Tampa riot (Tampa, FL)
  - June 12 – June 15: Cincinnati riot (Cincinnati, OH)
  - June 17: Atlanta riot (Atlanta, GA)
  - June 26 – July 1: Buffalo riot (Buffalo, NY)
  - July 12 – 17: Newark riots (Newark, NJ)
  - July 14 – 16: Plainfield riots (Plainsfield, NJ)
  - July 17: Cairo riot (Cairo, IL)
  - July 20 – 21: Minneapolis riot (Minneapolis, MN)
  - July 23 – 25: Toledo riot (Toledo, OH)
  - July 23 – 28: Detroit riot (Detroit, MI)
  - July 24: Cambridge riot (Cambridge, MD)
  - July 26: Saginaw riot (Saginaw, MI)
  - July 30: Albina riot (Portland, OR)
  - July 30 – August 3: Milwaukee riot (Milwaukee, WI)
- 1968: Protests of 1968
  - Orangeburg massacre (Orangeburg, SC)
- 1968: King-assassination riots (riots following the assassination of Martin Luther King Jr.)
  - Baltimore riot of 1968 (Baltimore, MD)
  - Chicago West Side riots (Chicago, IL)
  - Louisville riots of 1968 (Louisville, KY)
  - 1968 Washington, D.C. riots (Washington, D.C.)
  - 1968 Wilmington riots (Wilmington, DE)
- 1968: Cleveland, OH – Glenville shootout and riot
- 1969: York, PA – 1969 York Race Riot
- 1969: New York, NY – Stonewall Riot
- 1970: Augusta, GA – May 11 Race Riot
- 1970: Jackson, MS – Jackson State killings
- 1971: Camden, NJ – Camden riots
- 1976: Pensacola, FL – Escambia High School riots
- 1972: Coast of North Vietnam – USS Kitty Hawk Riot (October 12–13)

==== 1978 to today ====
- 1978: Houston, TX – Moody Park Riot (on the first anniversary of Joe Campos Torres' death).
- 1979: Worcester, MA – Great Brook Valley Projects Riots (Puerto Ricans rioted)
- 1980: Miami, FL – Miami riots (riots in reaction to the acquittal of four Miami-Dade Police officers in the death of Arthur McDuffie).
- 1980: Chattanooga, TN – Chattanooga riot
- 1984: Lawrence, MA – 1984 Lawrence Riot (a small scale riot centered at the intersection of Haverhill and railroad streets between working class whites and Hispanics; several buildings were destroyed by Molotov cocktails; August 8, 1984).
- 1989: Miami, FL – Overtown riot (two nights of rioting by residents after a black motorcyclist was shot by a Hispanic police officer in the predominantly black community of Overtown. The officer was later convicted of manslaughter).
- 1990: Miami, FL – Wynwood riot (Puerto Ricans rioted after a jury acquitted six officers accused of beating a Puerto Rican drug dealer to death)
- 1991: Brooklyn, New York, NY – Crown Heights riot (black anti-Jewish mob killed 2, injured 190).
- 1992: Los Angeles, CA – Los Angeles riots (riots in reaction to the acquittal of all four LAPD officers involved in the videotaped beating of Rodney King, in addition to the Korean involved in the murder of Latasha Harlins; riots broke out mainly involving black and Latino youths in the black neighborhoods of South Central LA and in the neighborhood of Koreatown before spreading to the rest of the city)
- 1996: St. Petersburg, FL – St. Petersburg riots (2-day riots that broke out after 18-year-old Tyron Lewis was fatally shot by Officer Jim Knight, who stopped Lewis for speeding and claimed to have accidentally fire his weapon).
- 2001: Cincinnati, OH – Cincinnati riots (riots in a reaction to the fatal shooting of an unarmed young black male, Timothy Thomas by Cincinnati police officer Steven Roach).
- 2003: Benton Harbor, MI – Benton Harbor riots
- 2005: Toledo, OH – 2005 Toledo riot (a race riot that broke out after a planned Neo-Nazi protest march through a black neighborhood).
- 2006: Fontana, CA – Fontana High School riot (riot involving about 500 Latino and black students)
- 2006: California – Prison race riots (a series of riots across California set off by a war between Latino and black prison gangs)
- 2008: Los Angeles, CA – Locke High School riot
- 2009: Oakland, CA – 2009 Oakland riots (peaceful protests turned into rioting after the fatal shooting of Oscar Grant, an unarmed black man, by a BART transit policeman).
- 2014–2015: Ferguson, MO – The Ferguson unrest (a series of riots that broke out over the shooting of Michael Brown).
  - 2014 August: riots for two weeks after the initial shooting of Brown.
  - 2014 November – December: riots for one week after the police officer who shot Brown was not indicted.
  - 2015 August: riots for two days during the anniversary of Brown's shooting.
- 2015: Baltimore, MD – 2015 Baltimore riots (protests-turned-riots following the death of Freddie Gray, an incident in which a suspect died in police custody)
- 2016: Salt Lake City, UT – Riots sparked by the shooting of Abdullahi Omar Mohamed.
- 2020: Nationwide – 2020 United States riots (protests-turned-riots that broke out across the US following the murder of George Floyd).

== Asia ==
Country	Riot	Notes	References
Azerbaijan (incl. Soviet Azerbaijan)	1988 Sumgait pogrom	Anti-Armenian pogrom riots in Azerbaijan SSR during February 1988	
Azerbaijan (incl. Soviet Azerbaijan)	1988 Kirovabad pogrom	Anti-Armenian pogrom	
Azerbaijan (incl. Soviet Azerbaijan)	1990 Baku pogrom	Anti-Armenian pogrom	
Bahrain	1947 Manama riots	Anti-Jewish riots led to the outbreak of civil war in Mandatory Palestine	
Bangladesh (incl. East Pakistan)	1946 Noakhali riots		
Bangladesh (incl. East Pakistan)	1950 Barisal riots		
Bangladesh (incl. East Pakistan)	1964 East-Pakistan riots		
Bangladesh (incl. East Pakistan)	1969 Dhaka riots		
Bangladesh (incl. East Pakistan)	1990 Bangladesh anti-Hindu violence		
Bangladesh (incl. East Pakistan)	2012 Hathazari violence		
Bangladesh (incl. East Pakistan)	2012 Ramu violence		
Bangladesh (incl. East Pakistan)	2013 Bangladesh anti-Hindu violence		
Bangladesh (incl. East Pakistan)	2014 Bangladesh anti-Hindu violence		
Cambodia	1975–79 Cambodian genocide	Systematic persecution and mass murder of Cambodian citizens, especially the minorities ethnic as Cham, Vietnamese, and Chinese sponsored by the Khmer communist government, the Khmer Rouge. It was proposed to create a homogeneous country only for the Khmer ethnic group.	
China	1988 Nanjing anti-African protests		
China	1997 Ghulja incident		
China	2002 Yizhou riots		
China	2008 Tibetan unrest		
China	2008 Uyghur unrest		
China	2009 Shaoguan incident		
China	July 2009 Ürümqi riots		
India (incl. British Raj) (see also: Violence against Muslims in India)	1882 Salem riots		
India (incl. British Raj) (see also: Violence against Muslims in India)	1895 Kalugumalai riots		
India (incl. British Raj) (see also: Violence against Muslims in India)	1899 Sivakasi riots		
India (incl. British Raj) (see also: Violence against Muslims in India)	1918 Kamuthi looting		
India (incl. British Raj) (see also: Violence against Muslims in India)	1948 Guwahati riots		
India (incl. British Raj) (see also: Violence against Muslims in India)	1984 anti-Sikh riots	Also includes the Hondh-Chillar massacre	
India (incl. British Raj) (see also: Violence against Muslims in India)	1991 anti-Tamil violence in Karnataka		
India (incl. British Raj) (see also: Violence against Muslims in India)	1997–98 Kuki–Paite ethnic clash		
India (incl. British Raj) (see also: Violence against Muslims in India)	2007 Christmas violence in Kandhamal		
India (incl. British Raj) (see also: Violence against Muslims in India)	2008 Kandhamal violence		
India (incl. British Raj) (see also: Violence against Muslims in India)	2012 Assam riots		
India (incl. British Raj) (see also: Violence against Muslims in India)	2014 Saharanpur riots		
India (incl. British Raj) (see also: Violence against Muslims in India)	2016 Dhulagarh riots		
India (incl. British Raj) (see also: Violence against Muslims in India)	Ethnic conflict in Nagaland		
India (incl. British Raj) (see also: Violence against Muslims in India)	2023 Manipur violence	Ethnic tensions between the Meitei and the Kuki people	
Indonesia (incl. Dutch East Indies)	1740 Batavia massacre	Pogrom in which Dutch East Indies soldiers and natives killed ethnic Chinese residents of Batavia.	
Indonesia (incl. Dutch East Indies)	1918 Kudus riot	Anti-Chinese riot	
Indonesia (incl. Dutch East Indies)	1965 riots in Sumatra and Kalimantan	Anti-Chinese riots	
Indonesia (incl. Dutch East Indies)	1998 Jakarta riots	Anti-Chinese riots	
Indonesia (incl. Dutch East Indies)	1996–1997 Sanggau Ledo riots	Anti-Madurese riots	
Indonesia (incl. Dutch East Indies)	1999 Sambas riots	Anti-Madurese riots	
Indonesia (incl. Dutch East Indies)	2001 Sampit conflict	Anti-Madurese riots	
2022 Southeast Maluku riots	Anti-Banda Muslims riots		
Iran	1839 Allahdad Massacre		
Iran	1910 Shiraz pogrom		
Iraq	1941 Farhud	Anti-Jewish riots in Iraq.	
Israel (excl. Mandatory Palestine, see below)	1947 Jerusalem riots		
Israel (excl. Mandatory Palestine, see below)	1936 Tulkarm shooting retaliation in Tel Aviv		
Israel (excl. Mandatory Palestine, see below)	1959 Wadi Salib riots		
Israel (excl. Mandatory Palestine, see below)	1988–92 First Intifada		
Israel (excl. Mandatory Palestine, see below)	2008 riots in Acre	Sectarian violence erupted on 8 October 2008 turning into 5 days of violence after an Arab-Israeli citizen drove through a predominantly Jewish neighbourhood during Yom Kippur.	
Israel (excl. Mandatory Palestine, see below)	2012 race riots in Tel Aviv	Race riots by Jewish Israelis against black African immigrants took place in May 2012 after the rape of an elderly woman and an underage Israeli girl by three Eritrean men.	
Israel (excl. Mandatory Palestine, see below)	2015 riots in Tel Aviv	After an Ethiopian-born IDF officer was beaten by an Israeli police officer and police volunteer, protests in Tel Aviv against racism and police brutality turned violent, with injuries among protesters and police.	
Kazakhstan (see: Ethnic conflicts in Kazakhstan)	1951 anti-Chechen pogrom in Eastern Kazakhstan		
Kazakhstan (see: Ethnic conflicts in Kazakhstan)	Fergana pogrom		
Kazakhstan (see: Ethnic conflicts in Kazakhstan)	2020 Dungan–Kazakh ethnic clashes		
Kyrgyzstan (incl. Kyrgyz SSR)	1990 Osh riots	An ethnic conflict between ethnic Kyrgyz and Uzbeks that took place in June 1990 in the Kyrgyz SSR	
Kyrgyzstan (incl. Kyrgyz SSR)	2010 South Kyrgyzstan ethnic clashes		
Malaysia	1969 May 13 incident	Sectarian violence in Kuala Lumpur	
Malaysia	2001 Kampung Medan riots	Anti-Indian riots	
Myanmar (see also: Rohingya conflict)	1930 Rangoon riots	Anti-Indian riots	
Myanmar (see also: Rohingya conflict)	1997 Mandalay riots	Anti-Muslim riots	
Myanmar (see also: Rohingya conflict)	2001 Taungoo riots	Anti-Muslim riots	
Myanmar (see also: Rohingya conflict)	2012 Rakhine State riots		
Myanmar (see also: Rohingya conflict)	2013 Myanmar anti-Muslim riots		
Myanmar (see also: Rohingya conflict)	2017 Tula Toli massacre		
Pakistan see: Sectarian violence in Pakistan	2022 Sindhi–Afghan strife	Anti-Afghan demonstrations after the killing of a Sindhi man	
Palestine (British Mandate) (see also: Timeline of intercommunal conflict in Mandatory Palestine)	1920 Nebi Musa riots	Anti-Jewish riots by Arabs in Jerusalem	
Palestine (British Mandate) (see also: Timeline of intercommunal conflict in Mandatory Palestine)	1921 Jaffa riots	Intercommunal violence in Jaffa	
Palestine (British Mandate) (see also: Timeline of intercommunal conflict in Mandatory Palestine)	1929 Palestine riots	Anti-Jewish riots by Arabs in Hebron, Safed, Jerusalem, and Jaffa	
Palestine (British Mandate) (see also: Timeline of intercommunal conflict in Mandatory Palestine)	1933 Palestine riots	Demonstrations against a proposal to allow unlimited Jewish immigration into Palestine. Police massacre demonstrators.	
Palestine (British Mandate) (see also: Timeline of intercommunal conflict in Mandatory Palestine)	1938 Tiberias massacre		
Palestine (British Mandate) (see also: Timeline of intercommunal conflict in Mandatory Palestine)	1947 Jerusalem riots	Intercommunal violence in Jerusalem	
Philippines	see: Ethnic issues in the Philippines		
Singapore (incl. Colony of Singapore and Malaysian Singapore)	1950 Maria Hertogh riots	Anti-Europe riots due to court decision to return Maria Hertogh back to her biological parents	
Singapore (incl. Colony of Singapore and Malaysian Singapore)	1964 race riots in Singapore	Ethnic conflict between Malay and Chinese due to disagreement of Malay special status between UMNO and PAP	
Singapore (incl. Colony of Singapore and Malaysian Singapore)	1969 race riots of Singapore	Ethnic conflict between Malay and Chinese triggered by Malaysian 1969 Race Riots	
Singapore (incl. Colony of Singapore and Malaysian Singapore)	2013 Little India riot	Triggered by traffic accident	
Sri Lanka (incl. British Ceylon) (see also: List of riots in Sri Lanka)	1915 Sinhalese-Muslim riots	Ethnic conflict between Sinhalese Buddhists and Sri Lankan Moors	
Sri Lanka (incl. British Ceylon) (see also: List of riots in Sri Lanka)	1956 anti-Tamil pogrom	Anti-Tamil riots by Sinhalese mobs	
Sri Lanka (incl. British Ceylon) (see also: List of riots in Sri Lanka)	1958 anti-Tamil pogrom	Anti-Tamil riots by Sinhalese mobs	
Sri Lanka (incl. British Ceylon) (see also: List of riots in Sri Lanka)	1977 anti-Tamil pogrom	Anti-Tamil riots by Sinhalese mobs	
Sri Lanka (incl. British Ceylon) (see also: List of riots in Sri Lanka)	1981 anti-Tamil pogrom	Anti-Tamil riots by Sinhalese mobs	
Sri Lanka (incl. British Ceylon) (see also: List of riots in Sri Lanka)	Black July riots of 1983	Anti-Tamil riots by Sinhalese mobs. Largely believed to be the main cause of the Sri Lankan Civil War.	
Sri Lanka (incl. British Ceylon) (see also: List of riots in Sri Lanka)	1987 Trincomalee riots	Anti-Sinhalese riots by Tamil mobs in Trincomalee	
Sri Lanka (incl. British Ceylon) (see also: List of riots in Sri Lanka)	Kalutara prison riots	Murder of 3 Tamil political prisoners by Sinhalese prisoners	
Sri Lanka (incl. British Ceylon) (see also: List of riots in Sri Lanka)	2000 Bindunuwewe riots	Murder of 26 Tamil political prisoners by Sinhalese mobs	
Sri Lanka (incl. British Ceylon) (see also: List of riots in Sri Lanka)	Mawanella riots	Ethnic conflict between Sinhalese and Muslims that took place in April 2001	
Sri Lanka (incl. British Ceylon) (see also: List of riots in Sri Lanka)	2014 anti-Muslim riots in Sri Lanka	Anti-Muslim riots by Sinhalese mobs	
Sri Lanka (incl. British Ceylon) (see also: List of riots in Sri Lanka)	2018 anti-Muslim riots in Sri Lanka	Anti-Muslim riots by Sinhalese mobs	
Sri Lanka (incl. British Ceylon) (see also: List of riots in Sri Lanka)	2019 anti-Muslim riots in Sri Lanka	Anti-Muslim riots by Sinhalese mobs	
Syria	1947 anti-Jewish riots in Aleppo		
Uzbekistan (incl. Uzbek SSR)	1989 Fergana massacre	After bloody riots against the Meskhetian Turks in Central Asia's Fergana Valley, nearly 90,000 Meskhetian Turks left Uzbekistan	
Tajikistan (incl. Tajik SSR)	1990 Dushanbe riots	Anti-Armenian unrest in Dushanbe, the capital of the Tajik SSR, from February 12–14, 1990.	
Yemen	1947 anti-Jewish riots in Aden		

== Europe ==
Country	Riot	Notes	References
Belgium	1941 Antwerp Pogrom		
Belgium	2006 Brussels riots		
Bulgaria	2007 anti-Romani riots in Sofia		
Bulgaria	Banya Bashi mosque clashes		
Bulgaria	2019 anti-Romani riots in Gabrovo	A mob of approximately 1000 Bulgarians rioted for four nights following the assault of a Bulgarian shop worker by Romani youths. Property destruction of the Romani area ensued.	
Denmark	1873 St. Croix labor riot	St. Croix agricultural labor rioted against landlords and labor laws.	
Denmark	1820–1822 anti-Jewish riots (also called Jødefejder, meaning "Jew feuds" in Danish)	Riots in various Danish and German cities and towns.	
France	2005 Perpignan riots	Riots in Perpignan between Maghrebi and Romani communities after a man of Maghrebi descent was shot dead.	
France	2015 Corsican protests	Conflict between locals and immigrants in December 2015 in Ajaccio.	
France	2020 Dijon riots	These riots between members of the Chechen diaspora and the resident Arab community occurred due to an assault on a Chechen teenager by Arab drug dealers.	
France	Nahel Merzouk riots		
France	2024 New Caledonia unrest		
Germany	1819 Hep-Hep riots		
Germany	1938 Kristallnacht	Anti-Jewish riots that would precipitate the Holocaust	
Germany	Neo-Nazi marches in Dresden	These marches have sparked many riots as recently as August 2015.	
Germany	1991 Hoyerswerda riots		
Germany	1992 Rostock-Lichtenhagen riots		
Greece	1931 Campbell pogrom		
Greece	1990 Komotini events		
Hungary	1946 Kunmadaras pogrom		
Hungary	1946 Miskolc pogrom		
Kosovo	2000 riots in Kosovo		
Kosovo	2004 pogrom in Kosovo		
Italy	2007 Chinese riot in Milan		
Italy	2010 African-immigrant riots in Rosarno		
Italy	2011 African-immigrant riots in Bari		
Italy	2011 African-immigrant riots in Lampedusa	Riots involving mostly Tunisians	
Italy	2015 riots in Sassari	Riots as result of refugees refusing to reside in provided buildings	
Italy	2016 anti-Arab riots in Sesto Fiorentino	Chinese-Italian riots against Arab immigrants and refugees	
Italy	2018 Italian-Senegalese riots in Florence	Senegal community riot the city of Florence	
Lithuania	1941 pogroms in Lithuania		
Lithuania	1941 Kaunas pogrom		
North Macedonia	2001 insurgency in Macedonia		
North Macedonia	2012 Republic of Macedonia inter-ethnic violence		
North Macedonia	2017 storming of Macedonian Parliament		
Norway	2008–2009 Oslo riots	Anti-Israel demonstrations in the city of Oslo	
Netherlands	1972 Afrikaanderwijk riots		
Netherlands	1976 Schiedam riots		
Netherlands	November 2024 Amsterdam riots		
Netherlands	2025 The Hague anti-migrant riots		
Netherlands	2026 Loosdrecht anti-asylum riot		
Poland	1881 Warsaw pogrom	Anti-Jewish riots in Warsaw, on December 25–27, 1881	
Poland	1902 Częstochowa pogrom	Anti-Jewish riots in Częstochowa, on August 11, 1902	
Poland	1905 Alfonse Pogrom		
Poland	1906 Białystok pogrom		
Poland	1906 Siedlce pogrom	Anti-Jewish riots in Siedlce, on September 8–10 or 11, 1906	
Poland	1918 Kielce pogrom		
Poland	1936 Przytyk pogrom	Anti-Jewish riots in Przytyk, on March 9, 1936	
Poland	1939 Bloody Sunday	Anti-German riots that occurred on September 3, 1939, in the city of Bydgoszcz	
Poland	1939 Skidel revolt	Anti-Polish riots that took place on September 18–19, 1939, in the city of Skidel, part of broader anti-Polish pogroms after the Soviet invasion of Poland.	
Poland	1940 Easter Pogrom		
Poland	1941 pogroms in eastern Poland		
Poland	1941 Szczuczyn pogrom		
Poland	1941 Wąsosz pogrom	Anti-Jewish riots in Wąsosz, on July 5, 1941.	
Poland	1941 Radziłów pogrom		
Poland	1941 Jedwabne pogrom	Anti-Jewish riots in Jedwabne, on July 10, 1941.	
Poland	1945 Kraków pogrom	Anti-Jewish riots that occurred on August 11, 1945, in the city of Kraków	
Poland	1946 Kielce pogrom	An outbreak of violence against the Jewish community of Kielce, Poland on July 4, 1946	
Poland	1991 Mława pogrom	A series of violent incidents in June 1991, when a crowd attacked Roma residents of the Polish town of Mława	
Poland	2017 Ełk riots	During the New Year's Eve, a Polish man was stabbed to death by a Tunisian man – incident sparked the riots.	
Romania	1941 Iași pogrom		
Romania	1990 ethnic clashes of Târgu Mureș		
Romania	1993 Hădăreni riots		
Russia (see also: Ethnic conflicts in the Soviet Union)	Anti-Jewish pogroms in the Russian Empire		
Russia (see also: Ethnic conflicts in the Soviet Union)	2006 ethnic tensions in Kondopoga	Anti-immigrant riots in Kondopoga, Karelia	
Russia (see also: Ethnic conflicts in the Soviet Union)	2010 Manezhnaya Square riot trials	Anti-immigrant riots on Moscow's Manezhnaya Square following the murder of Egor Sviridov	
Russia (see also: Ethnic conflicts in the Soviet Union)	2013 Biryulyovo riots	Anti-immigrant riots in Biryulyovo District, Moscow	
Russia (see also: Ethnic conflicts in the Soviet Union)	2023 antisemitic riots in the North Caucasus		
Slovakia	1945 Topoľčany pogrom		
Slovakia	1946 Partisan Congress riots		
Spain	2000 race riot in Almería		
Spain	2007 riots in Madrid		
Spain	2008 immigrant riots in Roquetas de Mar	Riot between Senegalese and Roma (Gypsy) families	
Spain	2015 African riot in Salou		
2025 Torre-Pacheco unrest			
Sweden	2010 Rinkeby riots		
Sweden	2013 December Stockholm riots		
Sweden	2013 May Stockholm riots		
Sweden	2016 riots in Sweden		
Sweden	2017 Rinkeby riots		
Sweden	2020 Sweden riots		
Turkey	1934 Thrace pogroms	Anti-Jewish pogrom in Eastern Thrace	
Turkey	1955 Istanbul pogroms		
Ukraine	1821 Odessa pogrom		
Ukraine	1881 Kiev pogrom		
Ukraine	1905 Odessa pogrom		
Ukraine	1905 Chernihiv pogrom		
Ukraine	1905 Kiev pogrom		
Ukraine	1914 Lwów pogrom		
Ukraine	1918 Lwów pogrom		
Ukraine	1919 Kiev pogroms		
Ukraine	1941 Lviv pogroms		
Ukraine	2014 Odesa clashes	Part of the larger pro-Russian unrest, these riots culminated in the 2 May city clashes, pro-Ukrainian rioters burned the House of Trade Unions where pro-Russian rioters barricaded themselves.	
Ukraine	2016 anti-Romani riot in Odesa	Local villagers attack Romani settlement in Odesa after the body of a 9 year old girl was discovered.	
United Kingdom	1911 Siege of Sidney Street		
United Kingdom	1911 South Wales anti-Jewish riots		
United Kingdom	1919 riot in South Shields	February 1919	
United Kingdom	1919 South Wales race riots	June 1919	
United Kingdom	1919 riot in Liverpool	June 1919	
United Kingdom	1919 riot in Glasgow	June 1919	
United Kingdom	1919 riots in London	In Stepney in April; on St Anne Street in May; and on Cable Street and Poplar in June	
United Kingdom	1921 Bloody Sunday		
United Kingdom	1936 Battle of Cable Street		
United Kingdom	1947 anti-Jewish riots in Birkenhead		
United Kingdom	1948 riot in Liverpool	August 1948	
United Kingdom	1958 riot in Nottingham	August 1958	
United Kingdom	1958 Notting Hill race riots		
United Kingdom	1969 Northern Ireland riots		
United Kingdom	1975 Chapeltown riot		
United Kingdom	1976 Notting Hill race riots		
United Kingdom	1979 Southall race riot	London, 23 April 1979	
United Kingdom	1980 St. Pauls riot	In Bristol	
United Kingdom	1981 Brixton riot	London, April 1981	
United Kingdom	1981 Toxteth riots	Liverpool, July 1981	
United Kingdom	1981 Handsworth riots	Birmingham July 1981	
United Kingdom	1981 Chapeltown Caribbean riot		
United Kingdom	1981 Moss Side riot		
United Kingdom	1985 Peckham riot		
United Kingdom	1985 Handsworth riots	Birmingham July 1985	
United Kingdom	1985 Brixton riot	London, September 1985	
United Kingdom	1985 Broadwater Farm riot	London, October 1985	
United Kingdom	1987 Chapeltown riot		
United Kingdom	1989 Dewsbury riot		
United Kingdom	1991 Meadow Well riots		
United Kingdom	1995 Manningham riot	Bradford, June 1995	
United Kingdom	1997 Northern Ireland riots		
United Kingdom	2001 Oldham riots	Oldham, May 2001	
United Kingdom	2001 riots in Burnley	Burnley, June 2001	
United Kingdom	2001 Bradford riots	Bradford, July 2001	
United Kingdom	2001 riots in Stoke-on-Trent		
United Kingdom	2001 Holy Cross dispute		
United Kingdom	July 2001 Belfast riots		
United Kingdom	November 2001 Belfast riots		
United Kingdom	2005 Belfast riots		
United Kingdom	2005 Birmingham riots		
United Kingdom	2010 Northern Ireland riots		
United Kingdom	2011 Northern Ireland riots		
United Kingdom	2011 London riots		
United Kingdom	2012 North Belfast riots		
United Kingdom	Belfast City Hall flag protests		
United Kingdom	2013 Belfast riots		
United Kingdom	2018 Derry riots		
United Kingdom	2021 Northern Ireland riots	Riots by Loyalist youths due to post-Brexit trading arrangements and the refusal of the PSNI to prosecute a Sinn Féin member's attendance of an illegal funeral. Eventually escalated when Loyalists threw petrol bombs into a nationalist area.	
United Kingdom	2022 Leicester unrest	Riots between Muslims and Hindus in Leicester.	
United Kingdom	2024 United Kingdom riots	Riots against Muslims throughout the UK.	
United Kingdom	2025 Northern Ireland riots		
United Kingdom	2026 Northern Ireland riots		

== Oceania ==
Country	Riot	Notes	References
Australia (see: Racial violence in Australia)	1828 Cape Grim massacre		
Australia (see: Racial violence in Australia)	1834 riots against Lascars (Portuguese creole stokers) - Perth		
Australia (see: Racial violence in Australia)	1836 Mount Cottrell Massacre		
Australia (see: Racial violence in Australia)	1838 Waterloo Plains Massacre		
Australia (see: Racial violence in Australia)	1838 Myall Creek massacre		
Australia (see: Racial violence in Australia)	1839 Murdering Gully Massacre		
Australia (see: Racial violence in Australia)	1841 Convincing Ground Massacre		
Australia (see: Racial violence in Australia)	1843 Warrigal Creek Massacre		
Australia (see: Racial violence in Australia)	1848 Avenue Range Station massacre		
Australia (see: Racial violence in Australia)	1849 Waterloo Bay massacre		
Australia (see: Racial violence in Australia)	1857 Buckland riot	Anti Chinese riots	
Australia (see: Racial violence in Australia)	1860–61 Lambing Flat riots	Anti Chinese riots	
Australia (see: Racial violence in Australia)	1868 Flying Foam massacre		
Australia (see: Racial violence in Australia)	1897 Riot after Catholics attacked Protestants during 12 July parade - Coolgardie		
Australia (see: Racial violence in Australia)	1901 Conflict between Catholics and Protestants - Kalgoorlie		
Australia (see: Racial violence in Australia)	1901 Anti-Protestant conflict on 12 July - Boulder 12 July parade		
Australia (see: Racial violence in Australia)	1905 anti-Italian riot - Gwalia		
Australia (see: Racial violence in Australia)	Broome riots (1905, 1914, 1920)		
Australia (see: Racial violence in Australia)	1910 anti-Italian riot - Leonora		
Australia (see: Racial violence in Australia)	1915 anti-German riot - Fremantle		
Australia (see: Racial violence in Australia)	1915 Mistake Creek massacre		
Australia (see: Racial violence in Australia)	1915-1916 anti-Greek riots in Australian cities including Perth & Kalgoorlie		
Australia (see: Racial violence in Australia)	1919 anti-Slav riot - Fremantle		
Australia (see: Racial violence in Australia)	1934 Anti-Italian/Slav riot - Kalgoorlie		
Australia (see: Racial violence in Australia)	2004 Redfern riots		
Australia (see: Racial violence in Australia)	2004 Palm Island riot		
Australia (see: Racial violence in Australia)	2005 Cronulla riots	Conflict between white Australian residents and Middle-Eastern Australian residents (primarily Lebanese Arabs)	
Fiji	2000 anti-Indian riots	Race riots following the 2000 Fijian coup d'état attempt	
New Zealand	1943 Battle of Manners Street	Conflict in Wellington involving American servicemen and New Zealand servicemen	
Solomon Islands	2006 Anti-Chinese riots in Honiara		
Tonga	2006 Anti-Chinese riots in Nukuʻalofa		

== See also ==
- Anti-Armenianism
- Antisemitism
  - List of ethnic cleansing campaigns
- Ethnic conflict
  - Ethnic cleansing
  - Ethnic conflicts in the Soviet Union
  - Ethnic hatred
  - Ethnic nationalism
  - Ethnocide
  - Ethnocracy
- Genocide
- Indophobia
- List of riots
- List of ethnic slurs
- List of ethnic slurs by ethnicity
- Pogrom
- Sinophobia
- Territorial nationalism
- Violence
- Xenophobia in South Africa
