= 1941 pogroms in eastern Poland =

Anti-Jewish massacres in eastern Poland in 1941

Immediately following the German invasion of the Soviet Union in June 1941, anti-Jewish pogroms occurred in at least 219 localities in the territories that had been part of Poland prior to 1939 and were occupied by the Soviet Union from 1939 to 1941. This included murders, beatings, robberies and other manifestations of anti-Jewish violence by the local population and were encouraged by the Germans and especially the commanders of the Einsatzgruppen had received orders from Security Police Chief Reinhard Heydrich to tolerate and even encourage the locals to launch pogroms.

== Background ==
According to political scientists Jeffrey Kopstein and Jason Wittenberg, the presence of a political threat is the strongest explanatory factor for why pogroms occurred in some locations but not others: "Pogroms were most likely to occur where there were lots of Jews, where those Jews advocated national equality with non-Jews, and where parties advocating national equality were popular."

== Pogroms ==
Pogrom is a Russian word meaning “to wreak havoc, to demolish violently.” The term usually refers to violent attacks by local non-Jewish populations on Jews in the Russian Empire and in other countries. Anti-Jewish pogroms occurred in at least 219 localities in the eastern borderlands of Poland, i.e. lands that had been part of Poland prior to 1939 and were occupied by the Soviet Union from 1939 to 1941. Among these pogroms were the Jedwabne pogrom, Lviv pogroms (1941), Szczuczyn pogrom, and Wąsosz pogrom. Kopstein and Wittenberg estimate around twenty-five thousand to fifty thousand "deaths resulting from neighbor-on-neighbor violence in summer 1941", significantly less than the 1918–1920 pogroms in Poland.

== List of pogroms ==
- Easter Pogrom, by local Poles on 22 and 33 March 1940.
- Radziłów pogrom by local Poles on 7 July 1941.
- Jedwabne pogrom in Jedwabne, carried out by its Polish inhabitants on 10 July 1941.
- Lviv pogroms in Lwów (now Lviv, Ukraine), perpetrated by German security forces, Ukrainian nationalists, and the local majority Polish population. from 30 June to 2 July 1941, and from 25 to 29 July 1941.
- Szczuczyn pogrom in Szczuczyn, carried out by its Polish inhabitants in June 1941. It was stopped by passing German soldiers.
- Tykocin pogrom in Tykocin, perpetrated by personnel of Einsatzgruppe B on August 25, 1941.
- Wąsosz pogrom in Wąsosz, carried out by Poles on 5 July 1941.

== Sources ==
- Kopstein, Jeffrey S.; Wittenberg, Jason (2018). Intimate Violence: Anti-Jewish Pogroms on the Eve of the Holocaust. Cornell University Press. ISBN 978-1-5017-1527-3.
