= Kopstein =

Kopstein is a surname. Notable people with the surname include:

- Felix Kopstein (1893–1939), Austrian-Dutch physician and herpetologist
- Jeffrey Kopstein (born 1962), American social scientist
