= Radziłów pogrom =

World War II massacre of Jews by local Poles

The Radziłów pogrom (Polish: Pogrom w Radziłowie) was a World War II massacre committed on 7 July 1941 in the town of Radziłów, in German-occupied Poland. Local Poles, under SS orders or with German encouragement, forced most of the Jews of the town into a barn and set it on fire, Jews were also murdered in surrounding villages. Death toll estimates vary between 600 and 2,000; only some 30 Jews survived the massacre due to help from local Poles.

The pogrom in Radziłów was similar to events in Grajewo, Wizna, Goniądz, Szczuczyn pogrom, Kolno, Wąsosz pogrom, Stawiski, Rajgród, and the Jedwabne pogrom.

== Background ==
=== Pre-WWII ===
In the 1928 Polish elections almost every Jewish resident of the town voted for a Jewish party, while 42% of the Polish electorate supported National Democracy.

On 23 March 1933, following the arrest of nine National Democracy members, supporters in its radical faction, the Camp for Greater Poland, initiated a pogrom which they referred to as a "revolution". Jewish property was looted, Jews were beaten, windows and market stalls demolished, and one Jewish woman was killed. The Polish police killed four of the Poles who were carrying out the violence against Jews and their property. As a consequence of the pogrom, the Camp for Greater Poland was outlawed by Poland's Interior Ministry.

The 1937 population of Radziłów was 2,500 including 650 Jews.

=== WWII ===
The Germans entered the town on 7 September 1939, but turned the town over to the Soviet Union at the end of September in accordance with the Molotov–Ribbentrop Pact. On 23 June 1941 the Germans re-occupied the town as part of Operation Barbarossa. The Germans were greeted with a ceremonial gate erected by Polish freed prisoners of the Soviets, bearing a photograph of Hitler and praising the German army.

In the Soviet occupied zone, the Łomża and the western Białystok regions were among the few regions with a strong ethnic Polish majority. Following the brutal Soviet occupation, local Poles greeted the Wehrmacht as liberators. Jews were viewed en masse as Soviet collaborators, an attitude influenced by the widespread antisemitism in the area. In particular, the strong pre-war influence of the National Democracy party had formed the Żydokomuna ("Jewish communism") stereotype among locals. These conditions were the ground for favorable reception of German encouragements to carry out atrocities.

On 27 June 1941 the Germans named Józef Mordasiewicz and Leon Kosmaczewski as heads of the local collaborationist administration, and set up an auxiliary Polish police force headed by Konstanty Kiluk. At least ten of the auxiliary Police had previously been imprisoned by the NKVD and were released by the Germans. The Germans armed those Poles whom they saw as trustworthy with guns.

Over the next few weeks the Jews of Radziłów, as well as refugees from other villages who had taken up residence in town, were tormented by German troops and Poles. Jews were beaten and robbed, Jewish holy texts were desecrated, Jewish women were raped, and hundreds of Jews were murdered.

Szymon Datner wrote on Jewish appeals prior to the massacre:

the scent of massacre is in the air....The situation would not be so desperate, were it not for the outspoken and hostile behavior of the local Poles....Finally people try one more thing: the local Catholic priest, Aleksander Dagalevski, is the greatest authority among the Radziłow´ Poles and Mrs. Finkelstein is a close acquaintance of his. She goes to him in order to persuade him to exert influence on his parishioners, and get them to cease perpetrating their outrages. Mrs. Finkelstein goes on her holy errand and receives the answer that all Jews, great and small, are communists, and that he has no interest in protecting them. To the question how small children could be guilty of anything, he answer that they aren’t really guilty, but that he can’t put in any good word for the Jews, because his own sheep would toss him in the mud. The holy man’s answer shook the shtetl’s Jews, and revealed to them the hopelessness of the situation.

— Szymon Datner

== Pogrom ==
On 5 July 1941, the Germans returned to Radziłów, and on the next day a Gestapo man along with the local town secretary started rounding up Jews from their homes and directing them to the town square. The Jews were led to the square by Poles. Although German vehicles with machine guns arrived that day, they left on the 7th.

Following the German departure, local Poles armed with guns herded Jews into a barn owned by Sitkowski, nailed the doors shut, doused the building with gasoline and set it on fire. While the barn burned, locals continued to hunt for Jews. Some Jews who managed to escape were shot, and some who were caught outside were forced to climb on the straw roof and jump into the burning barn. Jews from neighboring villages were not taken to the barn, but rather murdered on the spot. After the barn finished burning, Poles entered the barn and pulled gold fillings from the mouths of corpses.

Most of the killings took place between 7 July and 9 July 1941. On the third day of the barn fire, the 9th, the Germans returned to Radziłów. By the second half of July, no Jews were left in Radziłów save a few that hid before the pogrom began. Death toll estimates vary from 600 to 2,000, some 30 Jews survived with help from local Poles.

== Aftermath ==
Following the massacre, the homes of the Jewish victims were plundered. According to Krzysztof Persak, the news of the Radziłów pogrom surely impacted the attitudes of the local Poles in Jedwabne who carried out the Jedwabne pogrom on 10 July 1941. Some historians have posited that the nearly identical method of murder between Jedwabne and Radziłów indicates the influence of the German Security Service and Security Police which were operating in the area, being an implementation of a directive of the Reich Security Main Office which aimed to inspire "folk pogroms".

The remaining Jews were interned in a small ghetto from August 1941 on. On 1 June 1942 most of the ghetto inmates were deported to labor on the Milbo estate. On 2 November the Jews deported to Milbo were deported to a transit camp in the village of Bogusze. From there they were sent to Treblinka extermination camp and murdered on arrival. Approximately nine survived the war hiding in villages around Radziłów. On 28 January 1945 (five days after Soviet forces liberated the town), local Poles murdered two Jews who had survived in hiding.

Hermann Schaper, whose SS unit was involved in some of the atrocities in Radziłów, was tried in Germany in 1976 for other crimes against Poles and Jews and was sentenced to six years in prison, however after an appeal this was overturned and his health was declared too fragile for a new trial.

Eight local Polish perpetrators were tried in Polish courts after the war, almost of all them inhabitants of small villages or members of the local auxiliary police, distinguished in local collective memory as active participants, as opposed to the mass of "ordinary" neighbors who merely stood by during the pogrom. However, transcripts from investigations and trials show that these two groups were not separated by a barrier but that rather the police merely formed the front line. Kosmaczewski's sentence was mild as he was also punished with a six-year incarceration and was later given three years' remission due to an amnesty granted by the Polish government for underground activists. Josef Przybyszewski, the editor in chief of the local paper and was the identified moral instigator of the pogrom, was sentenced to two years imprisonment, a verdict that was later overturned by a court in Warsaw, which declared his innocence.
