= Rangoon riots =

Rangoon riots may refer to:

- 1893 Rangoon riots, religious riots between Hindus and Muslims in the city of Rangoon.
- 1930 Rangoon riots, race riots between Indian dockworkers and Burman labourers in that began May, 1930, in the city of Rangoon
- 1931 Rangoon riots, anti-Chinese riots led by Burmese mobs erupted in Rangoon's Chinatown
- 1938 Rangoon riots, anti-Muslim riots that began in July, 1938, in the Rangoon
- 1962 Rangoon University protests, a series of demonstrations against campus regulations and the policy of the new military regime of General Ne Win
- 1967 anti-Chinese riots in Burma, anti-Chinese riots occurred in Rangoon following the agitation spread by a few Red Guards in the regional context linked to China's Cultural Revolution
