= 1941 pogroms in Lithuania =

Anti-Jewish massacres during the German invasion of Lithuania in 1941

During the German invasion of Lithuania in June 1941, a number of anti-Jewish pogroms took place. Unlike the 1941 pogroms in eastern Poland, which were committed by unaffiliated civilians, these pogroms were carried out by Lithuanian paramilitary forces. The most deadly of these was the Kaunas pogrom; over three days, 3,500 Jews were killed in the city.
