= Stephen E. Hanson =

American scholar

Stephen E. Hanson is the Lettie Pate Evans Professor in the Department of Government at the College of William & Mary.

In 1985, Hanson received a BA in Social Studies from Harvard University and in 1991 a PhD in Political Science from the University of California, Berkeley.

In 1998, Hanson's book Time and Revolution received the Wayne S. Vucinich book award from the Association for Slavic, East European, and Eurasian Studies.

== Books ==
- with Jeffrey Kopstein The Assault on the State: How the Global Attack on Modern Government Endangers Our Future ISBN 978-1-509-56316-6 (Polity, 2024)
- Post-Imperial Democracies: Ideology and Party Formation in Third Republic France, Weimar Germany, and Post-Soviet Russia ISBN 978-0-521-88351-1 (Cambridge University Press, 2010)
- with Richard Anderson Jr., M. Steven Fish, and Philip Roeder Postcommunism and the Theory of Democracy ISBN 978-0-691-08917-1 (Princeton University Press, 2001)
- Time and Revolution: Marxism and the Design of Soviet Institutions ISBN 978-0-8078-4615-5 (University of North Carolina Press, 1997)

=== Editor ===
- with Grzegorz Ekiert Capitalism and Democracy in Eastern and Central Europe: Assessing the Legacy of Communist Rule (Cambridge University Press, 2003)
- with Willfried Spohn Can Europe Work? Germany and the Reconstruction of Postcommunist Societies (University of Washington Press, 1995)
