= Steven Fish =

American political scientist

M. Steven Fish
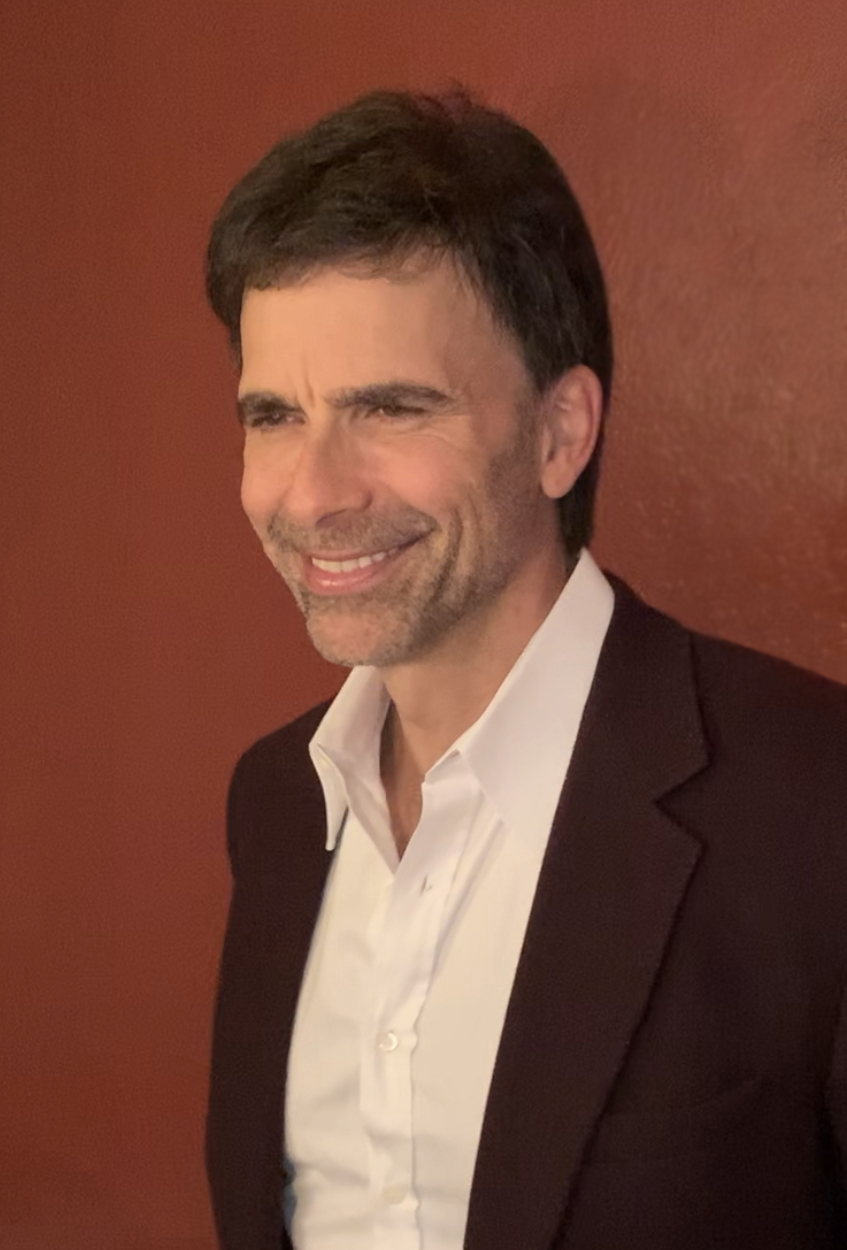
- Born: August 3, 1962 (age 64)
- Education: Stanford University (PhD), Johns Hopkins University School of Advanced International Studies (MA), Cornell University (BA)
- Occupation: Political Scientist
- Employer: UC Berkeley
- Known for: authoritarianism and democracy, postcommunist countries, legislatures and constitutional systems, economic reform, religion and politics

Michael Steven Fish (born August 3, 1962) is a professor of political science at the University of California, Berkeley. His research interests include democracy, authoritarianism, postcommunist countries, legislatures and constitutional systems, economic reform, and religion and politics.

Fish writes and comments extensively on international affairs and the rising challenges to democracy in the United States and around the world. He is a commentator in the media, including BBC World News, CNN, and other major networks, and has published in The New York Times, The Washington Post, Los Angeles Times, The American Interest, The Daily Beast, Slate, and Foreign Policy.

He studied international relations, economics and history at Cornell University and Johns Hopkins University School of Advanced International Studies. Fish received his Ph.D. in political science from Stanford in 1993. In addition to UC Berkeley, Fish has taught at the University of Pennsylvania and served as a Senior Fulbright Fellow and visiting professor at the Airlangga University in Indonesia and the European University at St. Petersburg in Russia.

== Scholarship ==
Fish's most recent book, Comeback: Routing Trumpism, Reclaiming the Nation, and Restoring Democracy’s Edge (2024), examines the causes of democracy's current crisis in America and proposes a new approach to campaign messaging for Democrats.

In Are Muslims Distinctive? A Look at the Evidence (2011), Fish tests a range of notions about Muslims and their political orientations. He finds little support for many prevailing stereotypes, including the view that Muslims are committed to fusing religious and political authority and are more prone to violence. He also finds that homicide rates and class-based inequalities are generally lower in predominantly Muslim societies.

Fish's work also includes research on legislatures and their role in democratic governance. His coauthored book, The Handbook of National Legislatures (2009), measures the powers of the national legislature in every country in the world. He served as the Project Manager for the Legislatures section of the Varieties of Democracy (V-Dem) project. In an article, “Stronger Legislatures, Stronger Democracies” (2006) he argued that vesting substantial power in national legislatures is vital to sustaining democratic regimes.

In Democracy Derailed in Russia: The Failure of Open Politics (2005), Fish investigated the demise of Russia's democratic experiment in the 21st century. He argued that Russian democrats’ failure to build a strong civil society, along with flaws in their economic reform program, Russia's hydrocarbons-based economy, and the country's “superpresidential” constitution paved the way for the resurrection of autocracy under Vladimir Putin.

Fish's earlier work focused on Russia's democratization after the dissolution of the Soviet Union. In Democracy from Scratch: Opposition and Regime in the New Russian Revolution (1995), which was based on two years of fieldwork in Russia during the late 1980s and early 1990s, Fish argued that Russia's democratic breakthrough, while momentous and impressive, might prove short-lived given the lack of emergence of a realm of robust civil society organizations.

== Selected publications ==
=== Books ===
- Comeback: Routing Trumpism, Reclaiming the Nation, and Restoring Democracy’s Edge, Irvington, NY: Rivertowns Books, 2024. ISBN 978-1953943521.
- Are Muslims Distinctive?: A Look at the Evidence. New York: Oxford University Press. 2011. ISBN 978-0-19-976920-9.
- The Handbook of National Legislatures: A Global Survey. (coauthored with Matthew Kroenig) New York: Cambridge University Press. 2009. ISBN 978-0521514668.
- Democracy Derailed in Russia: The Failure of Open Politics. New York: Cambridge University Press. 2005. ISBN 978-1-139-44685-3.
- Postcommunism and the Theory of Democracy. (coauthored with Richard D. Anderson, Stephen E. Hanson, and Philip G. Roeder) Princeton, NJ: Princeton University Press. 2001. ISBN 978-0691089171.
- Democracy from Scratch: Opposition and Regime in the New Russian Revolution. Princeton: Princeton University Press. 1996. ISBN 1-4008-2154-1.

=== Articles ===
- "What Has Russia Become?" Comparative Politics 50, 3 (April 2018): 327–346.
- “Attitudes toward Polygyny: Experimental Evidence from Six Countries” (coauthored with Rose McDermott, Michael Dickerson, Danielle Lussier, and Jonathan Cowden). In Rose McDermott and Kristen Renwick Monroe, eds., The Evils of Polygyny: Evidence of Its Harms to Women, Men, and Society. Ithaca, NY: Cornell University Press, 2018: 97–122.
- “Penury Traps and Prosperity Tales: Why Some Countries Escape Poverty While Others Do Not.” In Carol Lancaster and Nicholas van de Walle, eds., The Oxford Handbook of the Politics of Development. New York: Oxford University Press, 2018: 88–104.
- “What Is Putinism?” Journal of Democracy 28, 4 (October 2017): 61–75.
- “The Secret Supports of Mongolian Democracy” (coauthored with Michael Seeberg). Journal of Democracy 28, 1 (January 2017): 129–143.
- “Men, Muslims, and Attitudes toward Gender Inequality” (coauthored with Danielle N. Lussier). Politics and Religion 9, 1 (March 2016): 29–60.
- “Policies First, Institutions Second: Lessons from Estonia’s Economic Reforms” (coauthored with Neil A. Abrams). Post-Soviet Affairs 31, 6 (November–December 2015): 491–513.
- “Indonesia: The Benefits of Civic Engagement” (coauthored with Danielle N. Lussier). Journal of Democracy 23, 1 (January 2012): 70–84.
- “Conceptualizing and Measuring Democracy: A New Approach” (coauthored with Michael Coppedge, John Gerring et al.). Perspectives on Politics 9, 2 (June 2011): 247–67.
- “Islam and Large-Scale Political Violence: Is There a Connection?” (coauthored with Francesca R. Jensenius and Katherine E. Michel). Comparative Political Studies 43, 11 (November 2010): 1327–62.
- “Stronger Legislatures, Stronger Democracies.” In Larry Diamond and Marc F. Plattner, eds., Democracy: A Reader. Baltimore: Johns Hopkins University Press, 2009: 196–210.
- “Encountering Culture.” In Zoltan Barany and Robert G. Moser, eds., Is Democracy Exportable? New York: Cambridge University Press, 2009: 57–84.
- “Democratization and Economic Liberalization in the Postcommunist World” (coauthored with Omar Choudhry). Comparative Political Studies 40, 3 (March 2007): 254–82.
- “Does Diversity Hurt Democracy?” (coauthored with Robin S. Brooks). Journal of Democracy 15, 1 (January 2004): 155–66.
- “Islam and Authoritarianism.” World Politics 55, 1 (October 2002): 4–37.
- “Mongolia: Democracy without Prerequisites.” Journal of Democracy 9, 3 (July 1998): 127–41.
- “The Determinants of Economic Reform in the Postcommunist World.” East European Politics and Societies 12, 1 (Winter 1998): 31–78.

=== Op-eds and feature articles ===
- "Trump Knows Dominance Wins. Someone Tell Democrats." New York Times. May 6, 2024. (Retrieved 2024–5–9)
- 'Make Liberalism Great Again'. Slate. July 3, 2020. (Retrieved 2021–3–17).
- 'Trump, Russia, and the Democrats’ Golden Opportunity'. The American Interest. July 24, 2019. (Retrieved 2019-12-18).
- 'The Lost Language of Progressive Patriotism'. Real Clear World. December 10, 2018. (Retrieved 2019-12-18).
- 'Dethroning Ukraine’s Oligarchs: A How-To Guide' (coauthored with Neil Abrams). Foreign Policy. June 13, 2016. (Retrieved 2019-12-18).
- 'To establish the rule of law, cut off elites’ purses and power. Here’s how.' (coauthored with Neil Abrams). Washington Post. March 10, 2016. (Retrieved 2019-12-18).
- 'Why is terror Islamist?'. Washington Post. January 27, 2015. (Retrieved 2019-12-18).
- 'No, Islam Isn’t Inherently Violent, And The Math Proves It'. The Daily Beast. February 14, 2015. (Retrieved 2019-12-18).
