= 1947 Jerusalem riots =

Civil unrest following adoption of the UN Partition Plan

Coordinates: 31.7767°N 35.2342°E

- Part of Intercommunal conflict in Mandatory Palestine
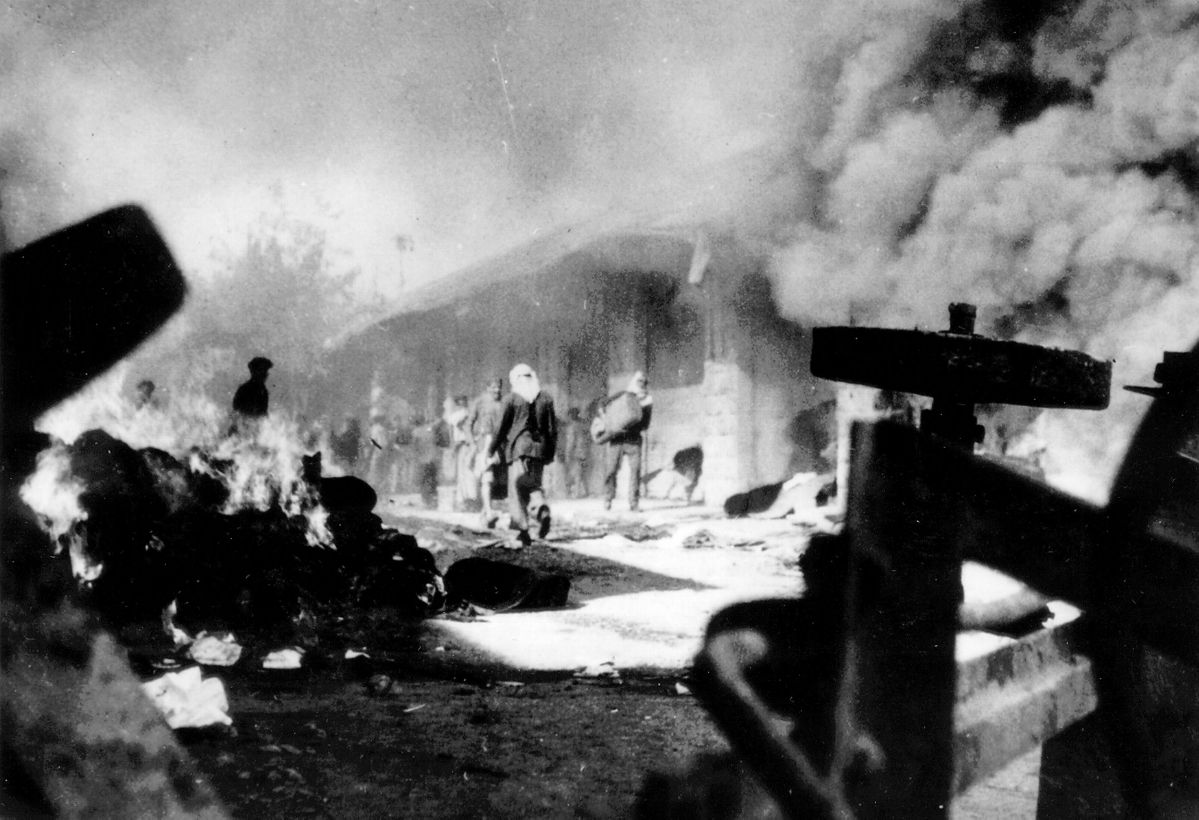
- Location: Jerusalem
- Date: December 2 1947
- Attack type: Pogrom, Riot
- Deaths: 8 Jews, 6 Arabs
- Perpetrator: Palestinian Rioters
- Motive: Antisemitism, Antizionism, Palestinianism

The 1947 Jerusalem Riots were a series of riots which occurred following the vote in the UN General Assembly in favour of the 1947 UN Partition Plan on 2 December 1947.

The Arab League declared a three-day strike and public protest to begin on 2 December 1947, in protest at the vote. Arabs burned many buildings and shops. Violence continued for two more days, with a number of Jewish neighborhoods being attacked.

Palestinian rioters stoned and stabbed Jews while burning and looting their shops. In retaliation Jews burned down an Arab owned movie theater and garage.

A consequence of the violence was the decision by the Haganah Jewish paramilitary organization to use force to "stop future attacks on Jews". The Irgun had conducted armed attacks aimed against population of nearby Arab villages and a bombing campaign against Arab civilians.

== See also ==
- 1947 Aleppo pogrom
- 1947 Manama pogrom
- 1947–1948 Civil War in Mandatory Palestine
