= Wąsosz pogrom =

1941 mass murder of Jews in Wąsosz, Poland

The Wąsosz pogrom was the World War II mass murder of Jewish residents of Wąsosz in German-occupied Poland, on 5 July 1941. The massacre was carried out by local Polish residents without participation of Germans.

== Background ==
When Nazi Germany invaded Poland in 1939, the village of Wąsosz (Podlaskie Voivodeship) was taken by the Germans in the second week of the war. At the end of September, in accordance with the German–Soviet Boundary Treaty, the area was transferred by the Nazis to the Soviet Union.

The Soviet Union invaded Poland from the East two weeks earlier, on 17 September 1939, pursuant to the secret protocol of the Molotov–Ribbentrop Pact. The Red Army overran 52.1% of the territory of Poland with over 13,700,000 inhabitants. The Soviet occupation zone included 5.1 million ethnic Poles (ca. 38%), 37% Ukrainians, 14.5% Belarusians, 8.4% Jews, 0.9% Russians and 0.6% Germans. There were also 336,000 refugees who escaped to eastern Poland from areas already occupied by Germany – most of them Polish Jews numbering at around 198,000.

Following the Nazi German invasion of the Soviet Union, German Wehrmacht re-entered Wąsosz on 22 June 1941. The Jews of the town, at that time, were 40% of the town's population—some 500 people.

== Pogrom ==
On the night of 4 and 5 July 1941, a small group of men armed with axes and iron clubs murdered several dozens of the Jewish inhabitants of Wąsosz. The killings were performed in a brutal manner, regardless of the victims' age or sex. The corpses of the murdered Jews were thrown into a large pit that was dug outside the town. According to the Institute of National Remembrance's investigation, the number of victims is at least 70. According to a report date 14 July 1941 by German security division 221/B "After the Russian withdrawal, the Polish populace of Wąsosz filled a barn with Jews, and killed them all before the German force entered [the town]".

== Aftermath ==
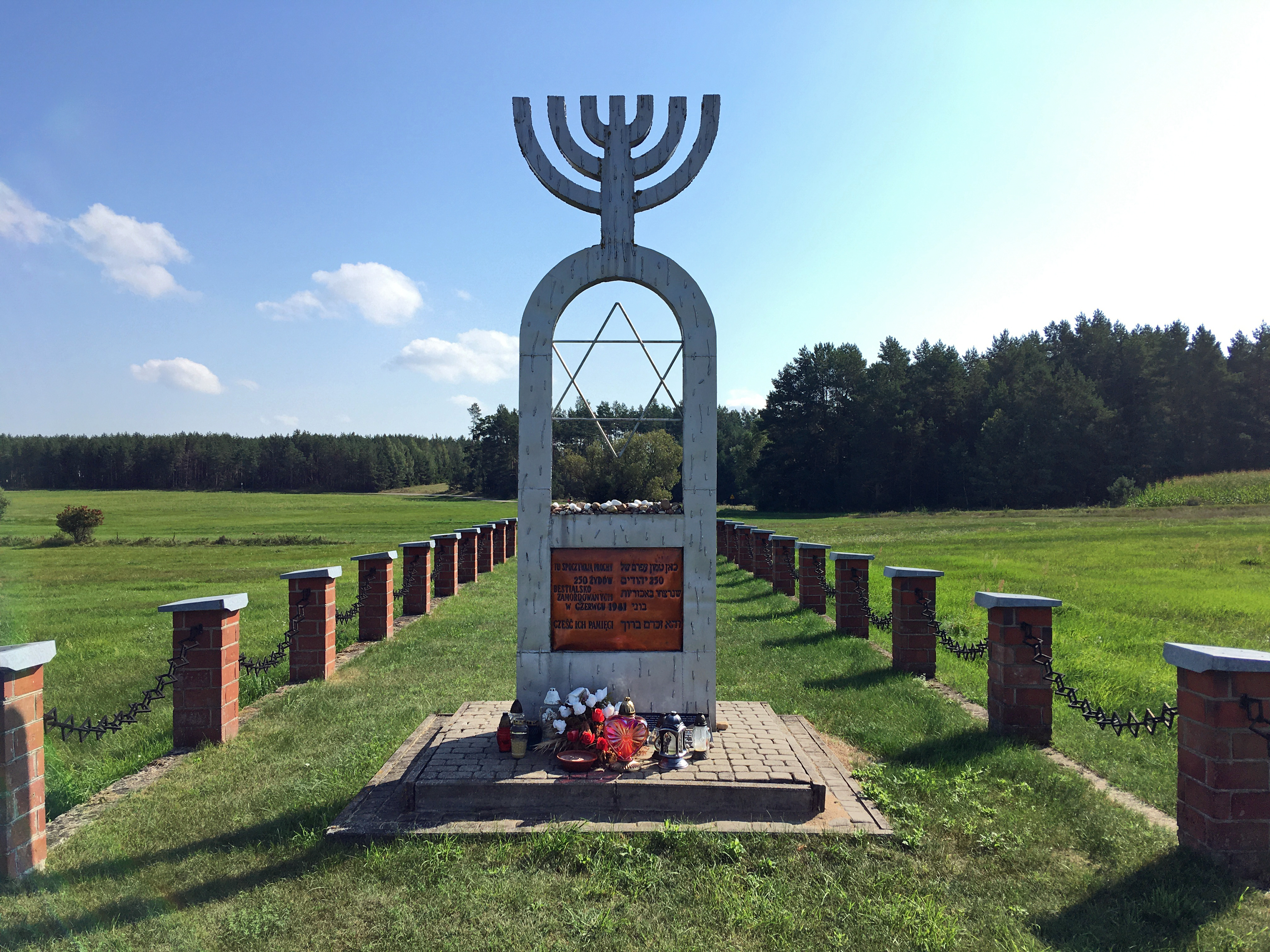
A monument for the victims of the Wąsosz pogrom

Menachem Finkielsztejn, a resident of Radziłów, described in a post-war testimony how Poles from Wąsosz arrived in Radziłów on 6 July saying that "It was immediately known that those who came had previously killed in a horrible manner, using pipes [?] and knives, all the Jews in their own town, not sparing even women or little children". However, they were chased away by the local townfolk of Radziłów, who then massacred the Jews of Radziłów on 7 July, killing the entire community except for 18 survivors. According to Andrzej Żbikowski the townfolk of Radziłów drove away the Wąsosz killers so that they could kill and steal the property of the Jews for themselves.

Fifteen surviving Jews remained in the town until 1 July 1942, when they were moved to the Milbo estate where some 500 Jews were employed in various works. In November 1942 the survivors were moved to the Bogusze transit camp and from there onward to Treblinka extermination camp and Auschwitz concentration camp.

In 1951, Marian Rydzewski was tried and acquitted for participating in the pogrom before a communist court.

== IPN investigation ==
The crimes committed in Wąsosz were investigated by the Institute of National Remembrance of Poland, under the direction of IPN prosecutor Radosław Ignatiew, who earlier investigated the atrocities in Jedwabne.

In 2014, Polish Jewish leaders were reportedly divided regarded exhumation of the bodies of the Jewish victims. Some, such as Poland's chief rabbai Michael Schudrich, are opposed due to the dignity of the dead. Others, such as Piotr Kadicik, the president of the Union of Jewish Religious Communities in Poland, supported the exhumation.

In 2015, while on vacation, Ignatiew was removed from the investigation and replaced with Malgorzata Redos-Ciszewska. The exhumation was not carried out, and the investigation was closed in 2016. The IPN did not identify any additional perpetrators beyond two Polish men sentenced for their actions shortly after World War II.

== See also ==
- Jedwabne pogrom
- Tykocin pogrom
