= 1930 Rangoon riots =

Race riots between Indians and Burmans

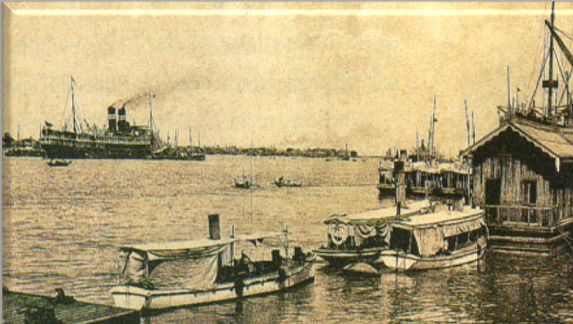
- Barr Street Jetty and Rangoon River, 1930
- Date: 26 May and 24 June 1930
- Location: Rangoon, Burma Province, British India; 16°51′N 96°11′E
- Caused by: Disputes over wages and labor rights
- Goals: Higher wages, higher employment
- Methods: Striking, rioting

Parties
Indian dockworkers	Burman labourers	Cameron Highlanders

Lead figures
Non-centralized leadership	Non-centralized leadership	King George V (Colonel-in-Chief); Maj-Gen. Neville John Gordon Cameron (Colonel of the Regiment)

Casualties and losses
120–200+ killed 900–2,000 injured	Unknown	Unknown

The 1930 Rangoon riots were a pair of race riots between Indian dockworkers and Burman labourers. The first broke out on 26 May near the Rangoon docks. It spread to nearby districts with high Indian populations and resulted in over one hundred killed and about one thousand injured. The second, a prison riot, began on 24 June in Rangoon Central Jail, where the staff was predominantly Indian and the inmates overwhelmingly Burman. The riots were overshadowed by the rise of Bamar Nationalism, Dobamar Asiyone and the Sayar San Rebellion.

In early May 1930, in the midst of the Great Depression, Indian dockworkers in Rangoon went on strike for increased wages. Burman labourers were brought in to break the strike, but the port became congested. An agreement was reached with the Indians to raise their wages, whereupon the Burmans were dismissed. As they returned to work the Indians jeered the outgoing Burmans and violence ensued. For days Burman mobs, often composed of toughs imported from other neighbourhoods, roamed about for Indians, who barricaded themselves in their homes and, in one case, in the local lunatic asylum. Order was only restored when the Rangoon garrison, the Cameron Highlanders, was sent in. According to British colonial government sources, roughly 120 people of Indian origin were killed and more than 900 were injured. However, more recent analyses estimate that more than 200 were killed and 2,000 injured. The majority of all killed and wounded was Indian.

During the riot, pro-Burman students and nationalists formed Dobamar Asiyone, which will dominant the modern history of Myanmar.

The riot in the jail was a lesser mirror image of the dockyard riots. The Indian prison staff killed, mainly by gunshot, 34 inmates (out of 2,000) and injured 60 others.
