= Murder of Egor Sviridov =

2010 murder in Moscow, Russia

Egor Sviridov

The murder of Egor Sviridov was the killing of an FC Spartak Moscow fan in a clash between two groups of youth, one of which was composed of recent migrants from Russia's North Caucasus republics. The incident took place on 6 December 2010 at Kronstadt Boulevard in the north of Moscow. Sviridov's death provoked a number of high-profile rallies and rioting in the capital as well as in Saint Petersburg, Rostov-on-Don and other cities across Russia.

== Biography ==
Sviridov graduated high school No. 1151 in Moscow in 1999. In 2004, he graduated from Moscow Geological Prospecting Institute. From 2004 he worked as an engineer and surveyor. Egor Sviridov was a prominent member of Fratria fan group of FC Spartak Moscow

== Incident ==
Egor Sviridov participated in a fight that took place on 6 December at 00:30 hours, on a bus stop by 37 Kronshtadt Boulevard in Golovinsky District of Moscow. More than 10 people were involved in the conflict between fans of FC Spartak Moscow and natives of the North Caucasus. The suspected killer and his friends were released and rumoured to have done so through bribing the police. It has now come to light that Aslan Cherkesov, who fired several bullets from a traumatic pistol that killed Sviridov, was convicted in 2009 of grievous bodily harm and drug possession, which carry severe penalties in Russia. Despite this, he appears to have avoided jail, which has given further weight to the allegations of bribery and criminality. Further anger was caused by the fact that the killing mirrored that of journalist Yuri Volkov. Also a Spartak Moscow fan, Volkov and his friends were attacked by a gang of Chechen men in July 2010. The suspected killer was released by the police with no charge. Official statements said lack of evidence was the reason, but there were open claims that the police had been bribed by members of Chechen diaspora.

Despite Cherkesov and his gang claiming to be acting in self-defence, witnesses state that it was they who actually initiated the brawl, as well as outnumbering the Russian Spartak fans 8 to 5. Sviridov and his friends were by a bus stand, waiting for a taxi to arrive. The Russian men were laughing and joking amongst themselves when the Caucasian group, passing by, confronted them and accused them of laughing at them.

== Aftermath ==
=== 7 December ===
Fellow fans and friends of Egor Sviridov blocked Leningradsky Avenue in an act of protest. According to the protesters, the cause of their outrage was the release of the detained killers of Egor Sviridov. They were headed in the direction of Golovinsk Prosecutor (Головинская Прокуратура) building, to investigate why the crime was being ignored. After not getting a desired response they blocked the avenue.

It would later be said that only Aslan Cherkesov remained under arrest as the prime suspect of the murder (105 УК РФ). Others were not charged, and released even though they took part in the fighting, and the surviving victims were treated in the hospital. Almost 2 days later, a criminal case was opened (116 УК РФ).

OMON forces were deployed to contain the situation. No confrontations were reported between the protesters and the militsiya. After negotiations with the OMON, the protesters cleared the avenue. According to General-Mayor of the militsiya Vyacheslav Haustov (Вячеслав Хаустов) - Over 1000 people, members of various football clubs, participated in an unsanctioned demonstration. In the vicinity of "Aeroport" metro station negotiations took place between the fans and state forces. Militsiya did not detain anyone.

Later, sources indicate that 20 protesters were detained, on charges of firing traumatic weapons and participating in an unsanctioned demonstration. They were released later that night. On 12 December, in the area of the "Kolomenskaya metro station", five teenagers attacked a citizen of Kyrgyzstan, beat him and stabbed him, as a result of which he died. According to the investigation, the young people wanted to "avenge" the murder of Sviridov.

=== 11 December ===
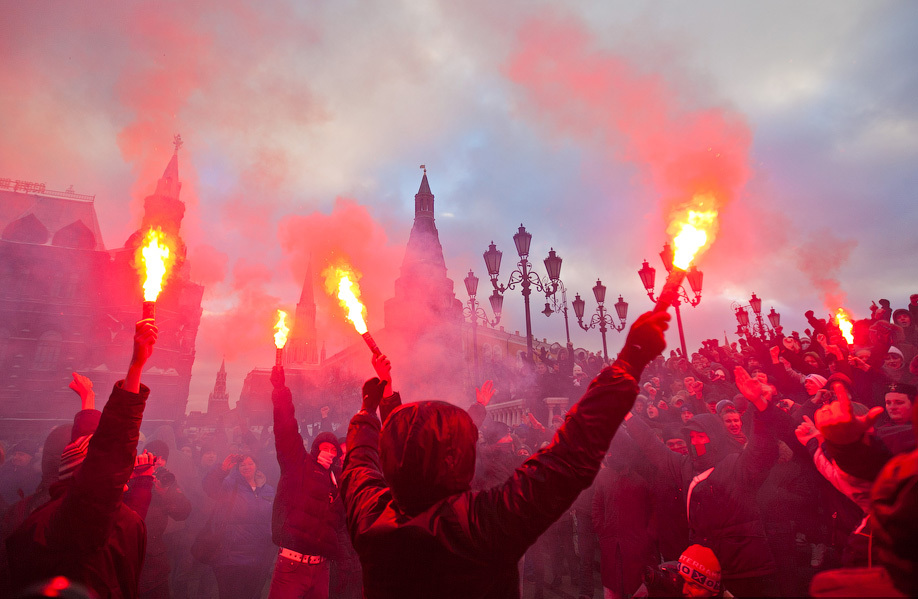
Manezhnaya, December 11

OMON in Manezhnaya

In Moscow

Early in the day almost 10,000 people came to the Vodny Stadion (Moscow Metro) station and from there proceeded to Kronshtadt Boulevard, where Egor Sviridov was killed, to lay down flowers and light candles.

Around 15:00 the crowd started gathering at the Manezhnaya Square, including members of several nationalistic organizations, soon becoming over 5.5 thousand strong. Sources indicate that as many as 50,000 people could have gathered. As OMON forces tried to control the situation, some protesters tried to breach the cordon on their way to Biblioteka Imeni Lenina, resulting in fights between the parties. The angry crowd on the way attacked passers-by of non-Slavic ethnicity. As OMON forces started dispersing the crowd, hostilities escalated, and both sides sustained casualties. A total of some 65 people were arrested, and 29 hospitalized. Three members of a National Bolshevik group, the Other Russia party (formerly linked to Putin through Dugin), were imprisoned for organizing the riot. Human rights groups have expressed concern that this is a case of selective prosecution.

In Saint Petersburg

A similar event took place in St Petersburg. People started gathering on Pioneer Square (Пионерская площадь) and heading in the direction of Pushkinskaya Metro station (Пушкинская). Numbering close to 1000, the protesters were stopped by the OMON forces. 60 people were arrested.

In Voronezh

At 19:00 about 350 people gathered by Tsentralnyi Profsoyuz Stadion (Центральный стадион профсоюзов), the city's central arena, to mourn the death of Egor Sviridov. The crowd was approached by Alexander Panyukov (Russian: Александр Панюков), the healthy living and sport manager for the Voronezh region. To his question about the purpose of the gathering, the people expressed their intention to proceed to Lenin Square.

At that time, Sergey Pashnev (Russian: Серге́й Пашнев), a colonel in the militsiya, joined the conversation and together with Alexander Panyukov had suggested that the procession head to Victory Square instead.

The demonstration was conducted in a peaceful manner and was over by 20:00. Present militsiya forces were not involved.

In Kaliningrad

80 young people gathered at the Russian Mother monument to lay flowers and light candles in memory of Egor Sviridov. The crowd was shouting "We won't forget, We won't forgive" (Russian: "Не забудем, не простим"). The presence of police forces was heavy. No confrontations were reported.

In Kirov

Several dozen people arranged a protest in Kirov.

In Samara

Hundreds of people gathered to pay tribute to memory of Egor Sviridov. With posters and lit flares they marched through the city. Intervention from militsiya forces was not required.

== Sociopolitical issues ==
Sviridov's death heightened racial tensions between Slavic citizens of Russia and residents of Russia from the North Caucasus. Moscow's chief of police, Vladimir Kolokoltsev, recently attributed up to 70% of crimes in Moscow to minorities such as Central Asians and North Caucasians. He singled out rape as crime with a major trend in Russian victims and immigrant perpetrators. There was, he claimed, a 79% increase on rapes in the last year alone.
