= Jeffrey Kopstein =

American social scientist (born 1962)

Jeffrey Stephen Kopstein (born 1962) is an American social scientist who specializes in interethnic violence, anti-liberal tendencies, and minority voting patterns with a focus on Jewish history in Russia and Europe. Kopstein received his PhD at University of California, Berkeley in 1991, subsequently held various positions at University of Colorado Boulder until 2002, subsequently at University of Toronto where he was a full professor until 2015, and from 2015 at University of California, Irvine, where he is Professor and Chair of Political Science.

Kopstein's recent research has focused on why Jews were massacred by the local populations in Eastern Europe during 1941 (in some 10 percent of localities), while in other localities the locals did not kill Jews on a wide scale despite the German encouragement. According to Kopstein, polarization within the community was a necessary prerequisite for a massacre.

According to Kopstein, research conducted inside and outside of Poland has established the complicity of some Poles in the Holocaust for instance in the Szczuczyn pogrom. Kopstein has called the 2018 Polish amendment to the Act on the Institute of National Remembrance an attempt to outlaw historical facts, as those who publish or publicly present scholarly findings on the complicity of Poles in the Holocaust would risk a fine or imprisonment.

== Books ==
- The Assault on the State: How the Global Attack on Modern Government Endangers Our Future.(with Stephen E. Hanson) Polity, 2024 ISBN 978-1-509-56316-6
- Intimate Violence: Anti-Jewish Pogroms on the Eve of the Holocaust, (with Jason Wittenberg), (Ithaca NY: Cornell University Press, 2018).
- Growing Apart? America and Europe in the 21st Century, co-edited(with Sven Steinmo), (Cambridge and New York: Cambridge University Press, 2008).
- Comparative Politics: Interests, Identities, and Institutions in a Changing Global Order, co-edited (with Mark Lichbach), (Cambridge and New York: Cambridge University Press), 1st ed. 2000, 2nd ed. 2005, 3rd ed.2009, 4th ed. 2013.
- The Politics of Economic Decline in East Germany 1945-1989, (Chapel Hill and London: University of North Carolina Press, 1997).
