= Ethnic conflicts in the Soviet Union =

There are many different ethnic groups present in Russia and the countries of the former Soviet Union today. This diversity has been the source or instigator of conflict for centuries, and remains a major part of Russian political life today. While the Russian Empire, the Soviet Union, and the Russian Federation were each made up of a majority of ethnic Russians, the minority groups have always been present to fight for their own languages, cultures, and religions. There are many different types of ethnic conflict, and the vast majority can only be understood with the help of a historical context.

== Background ==
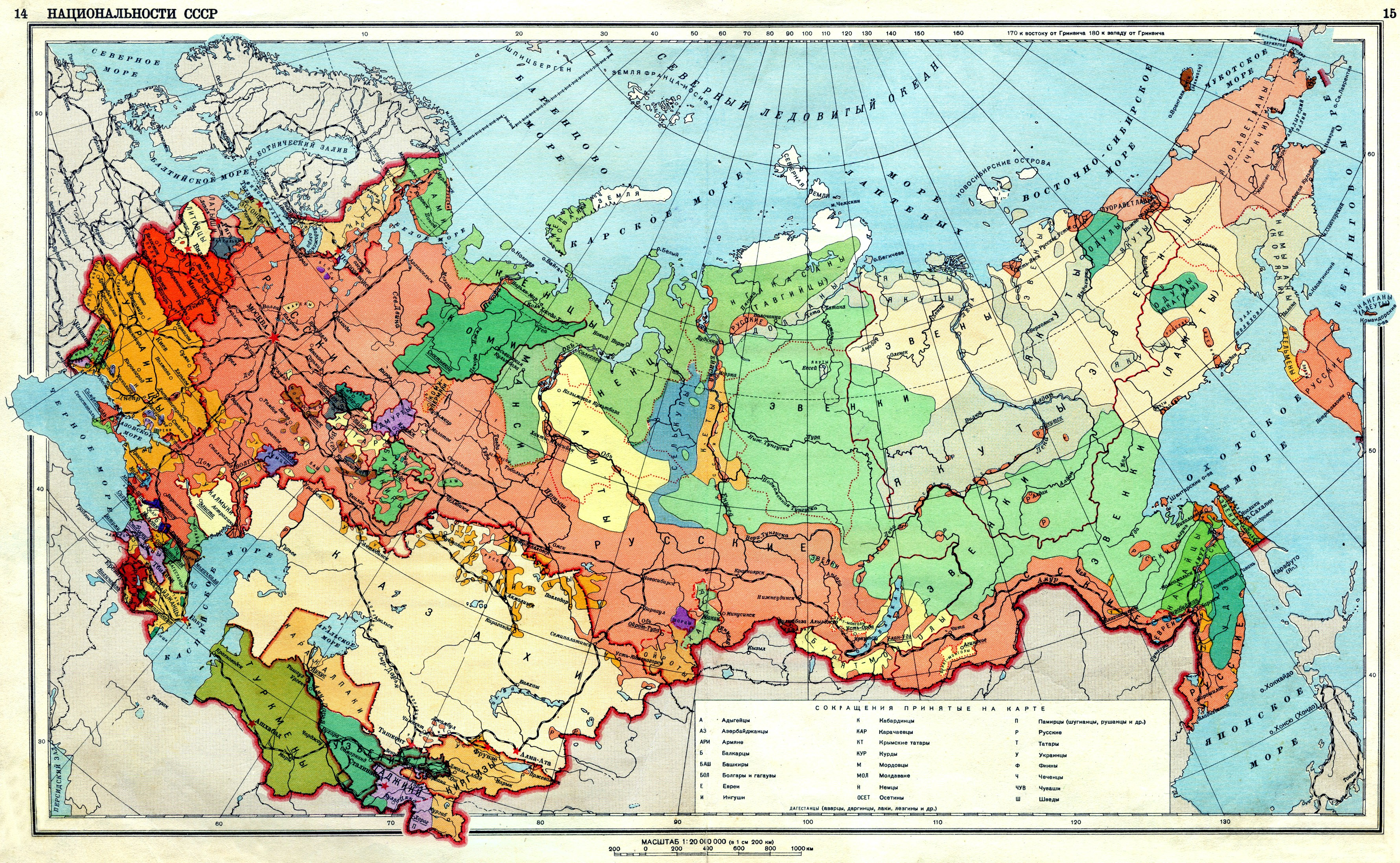
Ethnic map of the Soviet Union (1941).

The policies of Vladimir Lenin designated autonomous republics, provinces, regions, and districts for groups of non-Russian ethnicity. One of the most prominent attempts at resistance to Soviet control was in the Turkestan region of Central Asia by a Muslim guerrilla group called the Basmachi. The Basmachi rebellion continued from 1918 to 1924, when the Soviet armies finally crushed the revolt with a mixture of military force, concessionary policies, and elimination of the majority of the region’s tribal and nationalist leaders. The leadership of Joseph Stalin reintroduced many of the assimilation policies of the imperial period, urging loyalty to the Soviet Union only. He opposed national autonomy to the extent that he replaced the leaders of each republic with ethnic Russian members of the Communist party and regularly removed leaders of ethnic nations from power. This policy continued through to the leadership of Mikhail Gorbachev, who replaced the first secretary of the Communist Party of Kazakhstan with an ethnic Russian. This initiated the first major instance of ethnic violence, in which riots broke out among demonstrators and ten thousand Soviet troops were deployed to quell the revolt. Other conflicts followed in the late 1980s, including the Armenian–Azerbaijani conflict over the Nagorno-Karabakh region, the Uzbek-Meskhetian Turk conflict over Uzbekistan’s Fergana Valley, and bids by numerous ethnic groups for Soviet republic status.

=== Transition ===
As the Soviet Union began to collapse, social disintegration and political instability fueled a surge in ethnic conflict. Social and economic disparities, along with ethnic differences, created an upsurge in nationalism within groups and discrimination between groups. In particular, disputes over territorial boundaries have been the source of conflict between states experiencing political transition and upheaval. Territorial conflicts can involve several different issues: the reunification of ethnic groups which have been separated, restoration of territorial rights to those who experienced forced deportation, and restoration of boundaries arbitrarily changed during the Soviet era. Territorial disputes remain significant points of controversy as minority groups consistently oppose election outcomes and seek autonomy and self-determination. In addition to territorial disputes and other structural causes of conflict, legacies from the Soviet and pre-Soviet eras, along with the suddenness of the actual sociopolitical change, have resulted in conflict throughout the region. As each group experiences dramatic economic reform and political democratization, there has been a surge in nationalism and interethnic conflict. Overall, the fifteen independent states that emerged after the collapse of the Soviet Union face problems stemming from uncertain identities, contested boundaries, apprehensive minorities, and an overbearing Russian hegemony.

In particular, the post-Soviet Union territories continue to be especially vulnerable to "triadic" hostilities. Within this analysis, the newly independent states—nationalizing states—are in tension with the "homeland" state of Russia who will attempt to protect Russian ethnic minorities within the new states. Each of the incipient fifteen states except for Armenia had in 1989 substantive Russian minority populations, a cause for conflict between Russia and its former autonomous republics.

== Examples ==
=== During the Soviet Union ===
During the Soviet-Afghan War, Soviet troops were pulled from Russia as well as predominantly Muslim Soviet republics; they were not pulled from other European Soviet republics, though many Afghans believed that other European nationalities would be represented among Soviet troops. Early after the official deployment of Soviet troops, Soviet Muslim troops were observed discarding the red star badges from their uniforms. This turncoat behavior was both a rejection of their Soviet identity in favor of broader allegiance with Arab Muslims along ethnic and religious lines.

=== Post Soviet Union ===
There are several defined levels of ethnic conflict, and all levels were represented by various conflicts in the years following the collapse of the Soviet Union. These include claims presented in the form of declarations, introduction to and support of these claims by the masses, conflict not resulting in casualties, conflicts involving casualties, and interethnic wars. Of the total number of recorded ethnic conflicts, 40% correspond to one of the first two levels, while 15% have reached the third or fourth level. Conflicts such as the Armenia–Azerbaijan, Georgia–Ossetia, Georgia–Abkhazia, and Ossetia–Ingushetia conflicts have escalated to highest level, involving warfare. A predominance of these instances of ethnic conflict are located in the Caucasus and Central Asian regions as a result of territorial disputes and political unrest. In addition, conflict between Russia and other former Soviet states accounts for a large number of present conflicts. Hostilities between Russians and other ethnic groups remain a large part of social and political relations both among and within each state. Some minor territorial conflicts have occurred recently, but have not escalated to a level of concern.
