= Kamuthi looting of 1918 =

The Kamuthi looting was an invasion of Kamuthi by Maravars from neighbouring villages on 17 September 1918. The looting ended with around 50 rioters being shot dead by the police and two policemen being killed. It also resulted in property losses estimated at Rupees 50,000.

== Background ==
In the late nineteenth century, Kamuthi was a trading town surrounded by many villages. Its population was less than 7000 mostly Nadar and Muslim. These were the times when the Nadars across the Ramnad district were rising in prosperity and were seeking recognition of higher status in the society. There was economic unrest and bitterness against Nadar traders for rising food prices. In August 1918, a disturbance rose at the weekly market, when Maravar villagers squatted upon a stall site prepared by the Nadars in the market compound. The Maravars were attacked by the Nadars and filed a complaint before the police. A Panchayat composed of members from both communities was convened, which decided that the Nadars were the aggressors and a fine was levied against them. Ukkarapandia Thevar from Pasumpon wanted some definitive action against the Nadars. The scattered robberies made the Kamuthi Nadars to fear a recurrence of Sivakasi massacre.

A rumor circulated that Kamuthi would be stormed and sacked on 17 September. A detachment of 15 constables with a head constable was sent on 16 September. The police immediately started to disperse the mobs collecting around the town. The fight with the rioters resulted in five constables being seriously injured. The head constable wired his superiors for more men.

== Incident ==
The police equipped with carbines were stationed in the Bazaar street. Around 1000 Maravars entered the street and started to loot and set fire to the shops and houses. The police then opened fire at the rioters. As the riot was brought under control, around fifty rioters and two policemen including the head constable were killed. Around forty shops and houses in the Nadar bazaar street were looted and burnt. Property losses were estimated at Rupees 50'000.

== Aftermath ==
In October 1918, a punitive force of 50 reserve police was quartered in Kamuthi in order to maintain peace. A Penalty Tax was imposed on both Nadars and Maravars to pay the cost of maintenance. Even though this special force was to be stationed only for a year, it was continued year after year. In January 1922 W.P.A. Soundrapandian Nadar, introduced a resolution for the repeal of the punitive tax citing the burden it caused on both the communities. The Raja of Ramnad (son of Raja Bhaskara Sethupathi) joined Soundrapandian Nadar in assuring the council that there will be no longer disturbance on account of the old feud between Nadars and Maravars. The motion to repeal the tax was carried.
