= 2014 Saharanpur riots =

Religious riots in Saharanpur, India

- Date: 25 July 2014
- Location: Saharanpur, Uttar Pradesh, India; 29.30°N 77.21°E
- Caused by: Over a Small piece of Land

Casualties
- Deaths: 3 (2 in police firing)
- Injuries: 33
- Location of riots in Saharanpur, India

The 2014 Saharanpur Riots occurred on 25 July 2014 in the city of Saharanpur in the state of Uttar Pradesh in India. The riots occurred between Muslims, led by Samajwadi Party leader Muharram Ali Pappu, and Sikhs, led by Shri Guru Singh Sabha, over territory and religious differences. Three people were killed and several were injured. The ruling Samajwadi Party alleged that it was an act of RSS, the BJP blamed ISI and the UP police allege that the riot was well planned to divide members of the two minority communities.
In February 2020, Muslims relinquished their claim to disputed Saharanpur territory as a gesture of gratitude to Sikhs.

== Cause ==
The root of the clashes is a land dispute between former MLA Moharram Ali aka Pappu Ali and Gurudwara Singh Sabha in the Kutubsher area. The land is adjacent to the gurdwara near the railway station, of which both groups claims ownership. On 25 July, members of the gurdwara flagged off the construction to expand the gurdwara premises, and clashes broke out the next day.

The gurdwara management had purchased land 15 years ago, but Pappu claims that the land belongs to the mosque and Wakf board and there cannot be construction without their permission. A petition was filed in the civil court 10 years previously by Moharram Ali Pappu in the civil court, stating that the land belonged to the mosque. The Hindustan Times wrote on July 30, 2014, that three years ago some members of the local gurdwara committee met Pappu to settle the land row. Money was also offered to him but the deal fell through. One Abdul Wahab had challenged the gurdwara’s claim over the land and told the court he had done so at the behest of Pappu.

In May 2013, additional district judge passed an order stating that land belonged to the gurdwara.

== Clashes and security ==
On 26 July, Muslims supporting Pappu came together from Saharanpur, Moradabad and Muzaffarnagar, and attacked members of Gurdwara Singh Sabha using guns and swords. Members responded to them by pelting with stones. The fighting led to the death of three people (1 Muslim and 2 Sikhs) and left 33 injured. Shops of other Sikhs were set on fire. A curfew was imposed by the district administration and shoot-at-sight orders were given. Police arrested more than 60 people. The state transport cancelled all 569 buses which pass or terminate at Saharanpur. Forces including PAC, CRPF, RAF and ITBP are deployed in the troubled areas.

== Accusations ==
The main accused, Muharram Ali Pappu, was arrested on 30 July 2014 and booked under the National Security Act. Pappu is a former councillor of Saharanpur Municipal Corporation and has a criminal record. The police have registered a case against him and 66 others and charged 75 cases against them. The three killed were identified as Sarfaraz, Arif and Harish Goojar.

Moharram Ali Pappu had filed a petition in the court against the construction. Prabhjit Singh, a member of Shri Guru Singh Sabha, said that Pappu demanded 25 lakh for an out-of-court settlement, to which they did not agree.
