= 2010 Manezhnaya Square riot trials =

The 2010 Manezhnaya Square riot trials resulted in verdicts against Igor Berezyuk, Kirill Unchuk and Ruslan Khubaev for violent clashes in Moscow. Each was a member of The Other Russia party, and found guilty on charges such as inciting hatred and organizing the December 11, 2010 Manezhnaya Square riots. Berezyuk was also charged with assaulting a police officer. Human rights groups have argued that the three are political prisoners, and that their imprisonment is chiefly the result of their involvement in the unregistered Russian opposition party, Other Russia.

== Events at Manezhnaya Square ==
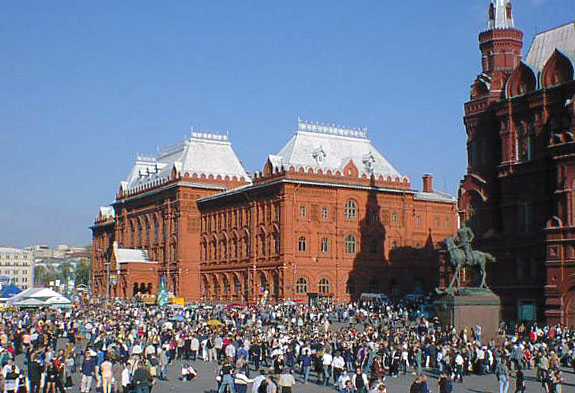
Manezhnaya Square, Moscow

The charges against the group relate to an incident on December 11, 2010, when football fans and local minorities clashed in a violent conflict that injured 32 people. Both groups, over 5,000-50,000 people, arrived at Manezhnaya square a week after football fan Yegor Sviridov was killed. That case inflamed nationalist sentiment after the party involved in his murder were identified as five Dagestanis, and that the Russian authorities had released four from custody. The Manezhnaya Square riots rose in the wake of that case, as protests from nationalist groups and counter-protesters clashed. Shortly thereafter, Russian authorities raided the offices of Other Russia, which human rights organizations have flagged as a biased measure, claiming it selectively prosecuted the leftist party while ignoring the responsibility of right-wing nationalist organizations.

== Arrests and trials ==
=== Igor Berezyuk ===
Berezyuk, a citizen of Belarus and a member of the Other Russia party, was arrested in a series of raids on that party's office and party member's apartments in January 2011, the night before a planned opposition rally in Triumph Square, Moscow. 11 other party members were detained and released. The Russian state had called for restrictions on public demonstrations following the outbreak of violent clashes between nationalists and minority groups. He was sentenced to eight years in a prison camp. This was reduced by three months after an appeal in 2012.

At the trial, Berezyuk was identified by a witness as having struck an officer during the riot, a charge to which Berezyuk plead partially guilty. However, no witness was on hand to verify that Berezyuk was an organizer of the riot.

During the raids on Other Russia party headquarters in which Berezyuk was apprehended, police also seized "computer cases, notebooks, a printer, speech amplifying devices and telephones," and "leaflets and posters carrying Other Russia and Strategy 31 emblems and posters with the emblem of the banned National Bolshevik Party".

=== Ruslan Khubaev ===
Khubaev was sentenced to four and a half years in a prison camp. This sentence was reduced by two months after an appeal in 2012 and he was released from prison on January 23, 2015. Human rights groups noted that during the trial, no witness was able to identify him as a participant or organizer of the riots.

Khubaev had been arrested previously for organizing protests against military conscription. In that trial, his arrest was combined with drug charges, and sentenced to 4.5 years. However, that case was appealed to the European Court of Human Rights. He was released in 2010, and returned to political activity as an organizer of the Murmansk chapter of "The Other Russia."

=== Kirill Unchuk ===
Kirill Unchuk was a known political activist, and had previously received a suspended prison sentence in 2008 for occupying a Foreign Ministry building.

Unchuk was sentenced to three years in a prison camp and was released on March 21, 2014. As with the rest of the Other Russia defendants, no witness was able to identify him as a participant or organizer of the riots.

=== Leonid Panin and Alexander Kozevin ===
Panin and Kozevin were arrested on similar charges and tried simultaneously. The two were not members of Other Russia. Unlike the others, the two apologized in court, and did not seek appeals to higher courts on the grounds of being denied a fair trial.

== International response ==
The Union of Solidarity with Political Prisoners and the Memorial Human Rights Center of Russia (Memo) have declared the Other Russia arrests politically motivated and declared the three to be political prisoners.

Memo asserts the trio are political prisoners owing to the selective nature of their prosecution. The group notes that while Other Russia is a left-leaning, anti-nationalist group, Russian nationalist protesters were present at the same rally. Memo asserts that the absence of arrests from nationalist groups from the same rally shows an inconsistency in applying charges, tantamount to selective persecution.

The trio appealed its case to the European Court of Human Rights in 2012. The court accepted the case that same year. The most recent reports on that review show the case is still being evaluated.

Russian officials have stated that there is no state process for convicting a person for a political crime. The Moscow Helsinki Group, the oldest human rights organization in Russia, argue that while there are no laws against political crimes, there have been cases of politically motivated charges.
