= Radziłów =

Village in Poland

- Village
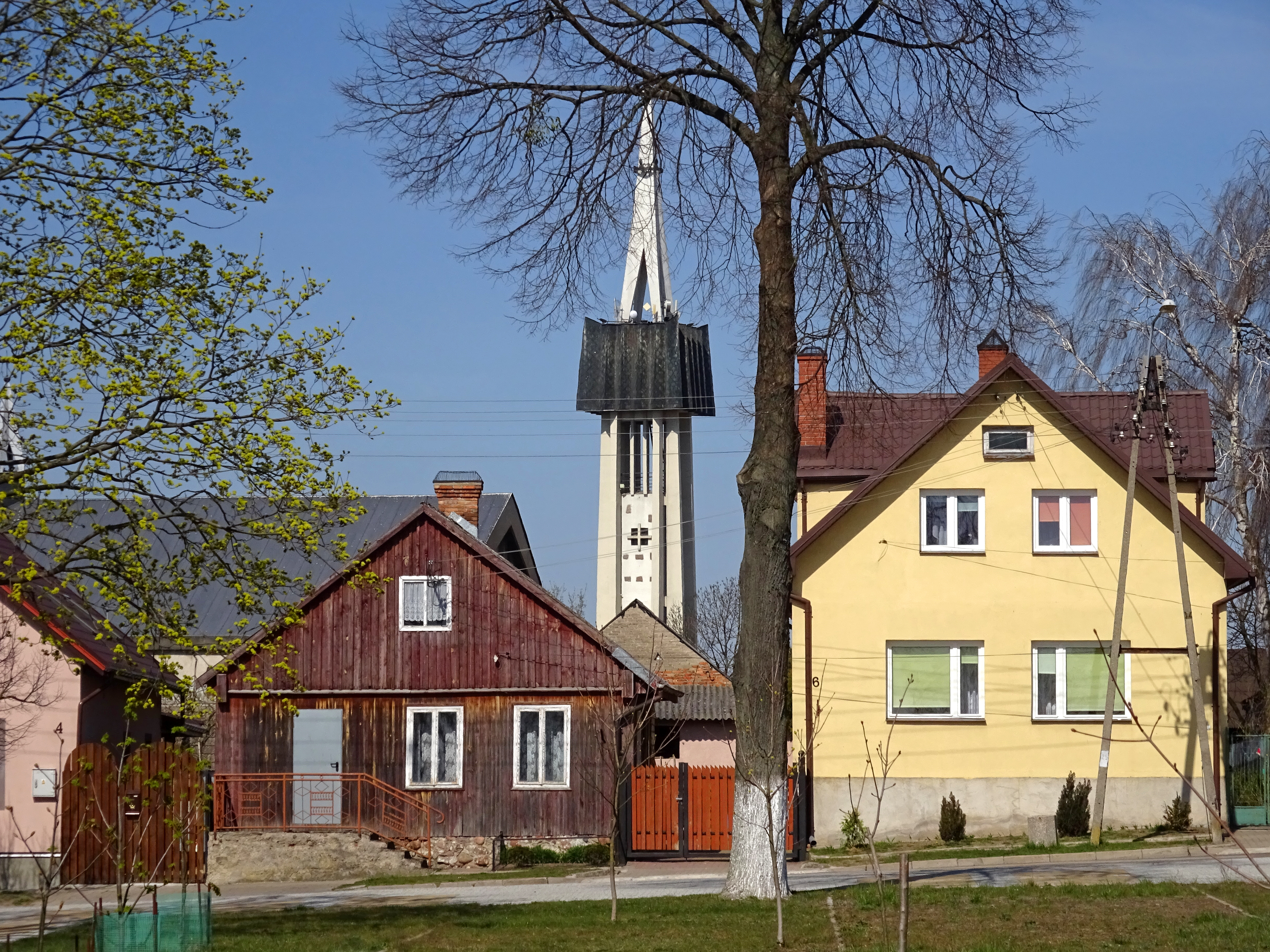

- Location within Poland
- Coordinates: 53°24′39″N 22°24′36″E
- Country: Poland
- Voivodeship: Podlaskie
- County: Grajewo
- Gmina: Radziłów

Population
  - Total: 1,267
- Time zone: UTC+1 (CET)
  - Summer (DST): UTC+2 (CEST)
- Postal code: 19-213
- Vehicle registration: BGR

Radziłów ([raˈd͡ʑiwuf]; Yiddish: ראַדזשילעווע, romanized: Rodzilova) is a village (formerly a town) in Grajewo County, Podlaskie Voivodeship, in north-eastern Poland. It is the seat of the gmina, an administrative district called Gmina Radziłów. In 2007 the village had a population of 1,267.

== History ==
=== Early history ===
The history of Radziłów is closely connected with the history of Masovia Province from before the Partitions of Poland. The first settlers arrived in the Middle Ages and began clearing the impenetrable forest. Masovian Dukes, who owned the area, issued the rights to enter the forest and harvest it. Among the first settlers were bee-keepers, fishermen, hunters and loggers, who sold honey, wax, fish and lumber to neighboring towns, Wizna and Goniądz. The lumber was also transported via Biebrza and Ełk river waterways to Gdańsk.

The founding of the town took a long time. Radziłów was formally established by Prince Konrad III, with Kazimierz III, Bolesław V and Janusz II, who gave it the town rights on May 9, 1466. The town began to flourish in the 16th century. It was a county seat and royal town of the Kingdom of Poland, administratively located in the Masovian Voivodeship in the Greater Poland Province. Located at a trading route between Wizna and Wąsosz, it became a commercial center for bakers, shoemakers, tailors, butchers, blacksmiths, wheelwrights, cooper-makers and potters. The main square in Radziłów at the time (180 m × 120 m in size) was bigger than in Warsaw (70 m × 94 m) and in Płock (140 m × 70 m) and held two weekly markets, on Monday and on Sunday (from 17th century on) as well as a fair on Wednesday added by king Władysław IV in 1641. The majority of inhabitants lived off farming.

=== Late modern period ===
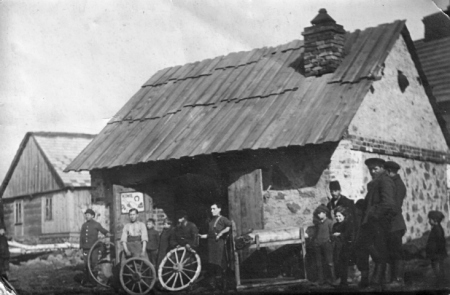
The Kowalski Forge in Radziłów, 1920s

During the partitions of Poland, after the suppression of the 1863 January Uprising against Russia, the Tsarist authorities changed the administrative divisions of Congress Poland placing Radziłów in the Łomża province. In 1869 the town was stripped of its town charter and became the village; however the population was steadily increasing due to Russian repressions against Jews some of whom found refuge in the area. The Jewish merchants expanded local trade, established breweries, small craft and various services.

Following the rebirth of Poland after World War I, two new public schools were established employing ten teachers, and two Jewish schools.

=== World War II ===
At the start of World War II, the Germans entered the town on 7 September 1939, but turned the town over to the Soviet Union at the end of September in accordance with the Molotov–Ribbentrop Pact.

In 1940, the town had a population of 2,865 people, of which 500 were Jews.

On 23 June 1941 the Germans re-occupied the town as part of Operation Barbarossa.

The Germans were greeted with a ceremonial gate, erected by Poles who had been formerly imprisoned by the Soviets, bearing a photograph of Hitler and praising the German army. The Germans appointed Józef Mordasiewicz and Leon Kosmaczewski as heads of the local collaborationist administration. Over the next few weeks the Jews of Radziłów, as well as refugees from other villages who had taken up residence in town, were tormented by the German troops and some Poles. Jews were beaten and robbed, Jewish holy texts were desecrated, Jewish women were raped, and hundreds of Jews were murdered.

On 7 July 1941, local Poles acting on SS orders or with German encouragement forced most of the Jews into a barn and set it on fire. People attempting to escape were shot, and Jews caught outside were thrown into the flames. Those Jews who managed to survive were hunted over the next three days. Jews from neighboring villages were not taken to the barn, but rather murdered on the spot. Death toll estimates vary from 600 to 2,000, but only about 30 Jews survived with help from local Poles.

The remaining Jews were interned in a small ghetto from August 1941. On 1 June 1942 most of the ghetto inmates were deported to labor on the Milbo estate. On 2 November the Jews deported to Milbo were deported to a transit camp in the village of Bogusze. From there they were sent to Treblinka extermination camp and murdered on arrival. Approximately nine Jews survived the war hiding in villages around Radziłów. On 28 January 1945 (five days after Soviet forces liberated the town), local Poles murdered two Jews who had survived in hiding.

Eight local Polish perpetrators were tried in Polish courts after the war. Hermann Schaper, whose SS unit was involved in some of the atrocities in Radziłów, was tried in Germany in 1976 for other crimes against Poles and Jews and was sentenced to six years in prison, however following an appeal this was overturned and his health was declared too fragile for a new trial.

=== Post-war period ===
In the following years, the Polish anti-communist resistance was active in the town and area, and, on 24 November 1945, it captured the town, seizing control over the police station and local government offices.
