= Mawanella riots =

2001 riots in Sri Lanka

- Mawanella (Sri Lanka)
- Location: Mawanella, Central Province, Sri Lanka
- Date: April 30, 2001; 9.30 PM (+8 GMT)
- Target: Muslim Civilians and Sinhalese owned shops
- Attack type: Armed massacre
- Deaths: 2
- Injuries: 15+
- Perpetrators: Sri Lankan Police, Local Thugs

The Mawanella riots was a series of attacks by the majority Sinhalese in the town of Mawanella, that resulted in the deaths of two people and left more than 15 injured in the clashes and also leading to destruction of millions of rupees worth property in the region.

== Incident ==
On April 30, 2001, a group of thugs entered a hotel owned by a Muslim, took some cigarettes without paying, and then menaced the cashier to hand over money. When he refused to oblige, the cashier was seized, dragged outside, tied to an iron fence and had his mouth slashed with a knife. Three policemen saw the incident but stood by and did nothing to help the victim. The injured youth could only be hospitalised after the attackers left.

When efforts taken by the hotel owners to persuade the Police to arrest those responsible went in vain, hundreds of Muslims took to the streets in protest demanding the criminals be brought to justice. According to some eyewitnesses in Mawanella, the initial attack was instigated by a gang that included the bodyguards of Mahipala Herath, a government minister from the Kegalle District. But the minister denied these charges as baseless.

Only when the protests intensified, the police promised to take action.

However, as the crowd was dispersing, a Sinhalese mob, several hundred strong, descended on the area and went on a rampage, setting fire to Muslim-owned shops, houses, businesses and mosques. One group entered the town's main mosque dragged out the cleric and burned furniture, a funeral casket and a copy of the Koran. Police were accused of helping the mob enter a hardware store by shooting off its padlock.

In retaliation a group of Muslims stoned the police station and attacked several Sinhalese-owned shops. The police in an attempt to disperse the protestors, fired into the crowd, killing two people, including 55-year-old Haniffa Mohamed, and injuring 15 others.

== Aftermath ==
Muslim Protests erupted in the wake of the incident, in various places including Colombo, Puttalam and Batticaloa. Shops of Muslims were attacked and the roads were blocked by burning tyres. Clashes took place outside the Maradana police station in Colombo, where police tear-gassed demonstrators and baton charged the crowd. Fifteen people were injured, two seriously.

Police took some drastic measures to quell the protests. Scores of people were arrested, including Mujibur Rahuman, leader of the Muslim United Liberation Front (MULF), who was later released on bail.

== Reactions ==
=== Sri Lankan Government ===
The government reacted to the unrest by imposing a 12-hour curfew in Colombo and throughout the adjoining Western Province. The government has announced the formation of a "peace committee" in the Mawanella area to include representatives of the Sinhalese and Muslim communities as well as local police chiefs. It has also promised to pay compensation to those whose property was damaged.

=== SLMC ===
Members of the Sri Lanka Muslim Congress blamed the Government for instigating and being indifferent to the riots.

A month later after the incident, the Sri Lanka Muslim Congress, a party formed in the 1980s to give voice to the Muslims of the east, broke from the PA coalition it earlier belonged to.

== See also ==
- List of attacks attributed to Sri Lankan government forces
- Black July
