= Racism in the Philippines =

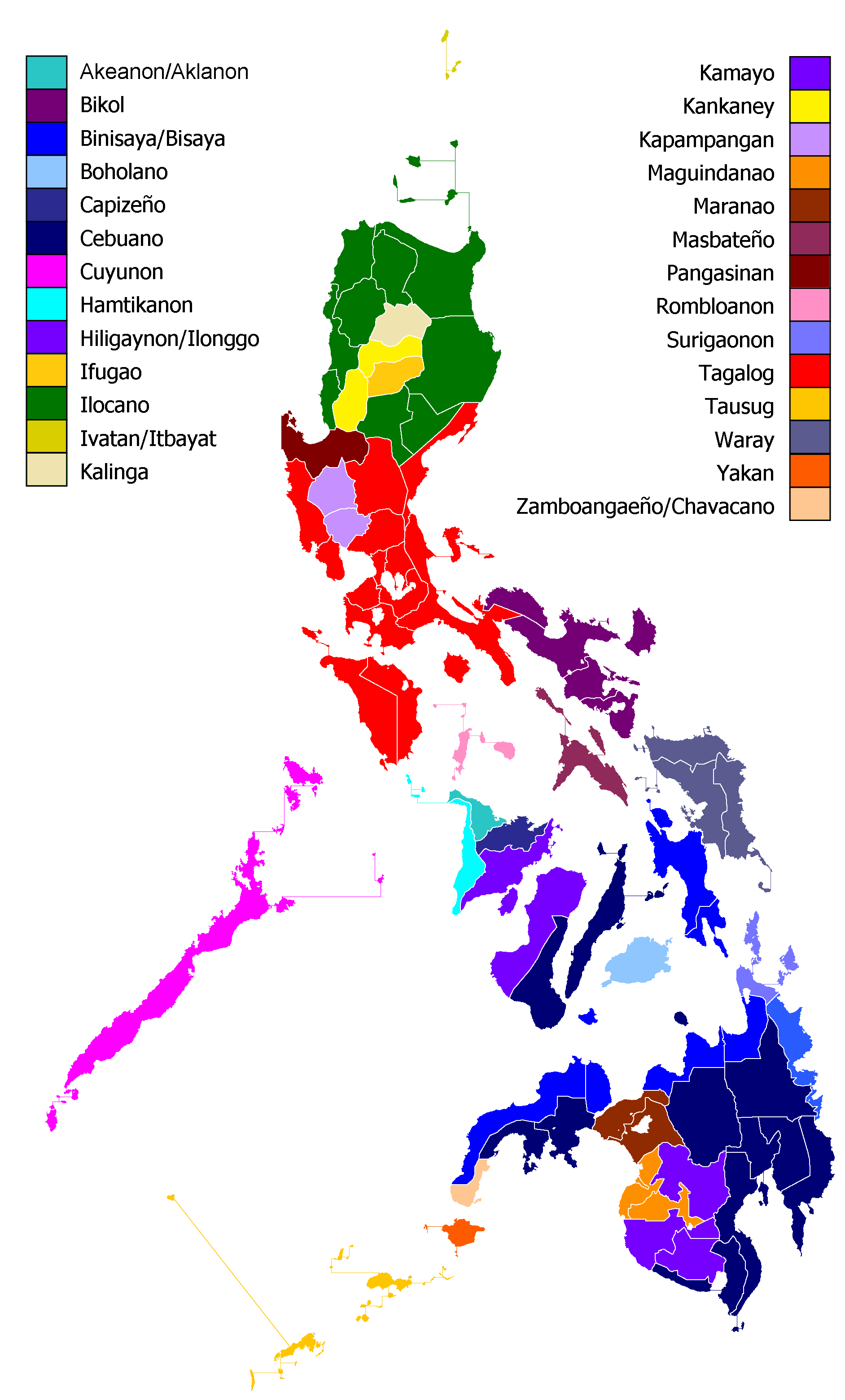
Map of the ethnic groups of the Philippines by province. Shade per province is determined by which group occupies the most in population

Racism in the Philippines is multifarious and emerged in various portions of the history of people, institutions and territories coinciding to that of the present-day Philippines.

== History ==
Racial discrimination in the Philippines has a historical foundation dating back to the Spanish colonial era (1565-1898), characterized by the implementation of a social hierarchy known as the "casta". This system favored individuals of Spanish descent, such as the "criollos" or "insulares", while relegating native Filipinos to the lowest rungs of society. The hierarchical structure entrenched during this period had enduring effects on societal dynamics, shaping power relations and perpetuating disparities based on racial heritage.

Following the Spanish colonial rule, the American colonial period (1898–1946) introduced new dynamics of racial discrimination, influenced by American cultural hegemony. This era witnessed various forms of racism, including economic exploitation, social hierarchy, and segregation. American colonial policies reinforced notions of superiority, contributing to the marginalization of indigenous Filipinos and the consolidation of power among American elites.

Despite enduring racism and oppression, Filipinos exhibited resilience and resistance, actively advocating for their rights and independence. This period of struggle culminated in the eventual end of American colonial rule and the establishment of the Philippine Republic in 1946, marking a significant milestone in the nation's journey towards self-determination.

Both colonial periods left lasting legacies of social stratification and economic exploitation. Indigenous Filipinos often found themselves disenfranchised and denied equal opportunities, while Europeans and Americans wielded disproportionate power and privilege. The exploitation of natural resources and the utilization of cheap labor further exacerbated socioeconomic inequalities, perpetuating a cycle of marginalization and subjugation.

== By ethnic group ==
=== Against Moros ===
Polls have shown that some Filipinos hold negative views directed against the Moro people due to alleged Islamic terrorism.

=== Against ethnic Chinese ===
Contact between the indigenous peoples of the islands and the Han began hundreds of years ago, predating the arrival of Westerners. Strong ties through trade and commerce sustained ancient states such as the Kingdom of Tondo. The Sultanate of Sulu also has significant relationship with the Ming dynasty whereas its leader Paduka Batara, granted the only foreign monument in China, was sent with his sons to pay tribute to Emperor Yung Lo. Despite years of contact, the rift between the two groups emerged at the height of the Spanish colonization.

After the destructive raids of various ports and towns including the newly Spanish-established Manila by Chinese pirate Limahong, the colonial government saw the Chinese as a threat and decided to curb the Sangley in the colony by ethnic segregation and immigration control. Assimilation by conversion to Catholicism was also enforced by the governor-general Gómez Pérez Dasmariñas in the late 16th century. Only Catholic Sangleys, Indio wives and their Mestizo de Sangley children were granted land such as in Parían and nearby Binondo. However, these measures to attain racial control were seen to be difficult to achieve. As a result, four massacres, the first happening in 1603, and expulsions ensued against unconverted Sangleys. Other ethnic-motivated incidents were during the massacre of Sangleys as a retaliation to Koxinga's raids of several towns in Luzon during 1662. This resulted in a failed invasion. It was said that although the ethnic Chinese in the island themselves distanced from the military leader, anti-Chinese sentiments among locals grew and led to killings in the Manila area. Another event is after the 1762 British occupation of Manila amidst the Seven Years' War. As the Spanish, who regained control of invaded Manila and nearby port province of Cavite, many non-natives specifically Spanish, Mestizos, Chinese, and Indians were imprisoned for supporting the British.

The Spanish colonial government imposed legislation on the ethnic Chinese, which were viewed unfavorably. Such laws were meant to Christianize the ethnic Chinese, aid them assimilate into mainstream Philippine society and to encourage them to take up farming. The Chinese were viewed as an economic, political and socio-religious threat to the small Spaniard colonial population in Spanish Philippines.

As part of the phenomenon of transculturation and acculturation in the modern Chinese Filipino community as an integrated minority group in Philippine society, some level of endogamy and self-segregation is also present stemming from concerns of protecting and preserving the cultural identity and cultural heritage of the group as part of its cultural rights on the basis of cultural conservatism to prevent and resist complete cultural assimilation and ethnocide, wherein some would refuse to marry Filipinos without Chinese descent. For younger generations in the Philippines, this phenomenon is called "The Great Wall" in reference to the Great Wall of China, as a euphemism to describe the social barriers used to prevent outside forces from entering and supplanting the culture. In this case, it is used to prevent Filipinos without Chinese descent from entering the Chinese Filipino family through interethnic marriage due to fears of complete assimilation of the family's cultural identity to the society's dominant cultures. Due to these fears and concerns, some Filipinos without Chinese descent who wish to enter into the Chinese Filipino community is said to have to "climb the Great Wall" in order to cross this social barrier and so, feel diminished and excluded from these barriers that prevent the dominant culture from completely subsuming the Chinese Filipino community.

There were renewed concerns by the Chinese Filipino community on racial tensions in the early 21st century, driven by the ongoing geopolitical dispute between China and the Philippines and the proliferation of Philippine offshore gaming operator businesses, especially one business run by the former Bamban mayor Alice Guo.

=== Against and between highland ethnic groups ===
The rights of the Philippines highland groups are legally protected under Indigenous Peoples' Rights Act (IPRA) which is cited as the first of its kind in Southeast Asia. The law enabled them to acquire titles to their ancestral domains. However the highlanders continue to experience some degree of discrimination and are described by cultural anthropologist Nestor Castro that "They still cannot identify with the so-called mainstream society or culture." Highlanders particularly experience marginalization in urban areas such as in Manila.

Ethnic divide among highland tribes began from the conception of a Philippine state notably during the Commonwealth of the Philippines. In order to actualize the dream of a unified Philippine identity, the said Commonwealth government established the Institute of National Language (Filipino: Surian ng Wikang Pambansâ) which adopted Tagalog as the baseline for the national language.
