= Szczuczyn pogrom =

Antisemitic pogrom

Szczuczyn pogrom was the massacre of some 300 Jews in the community of Szczuczyn carried out by its Polish inhabitants in June 1941 after the town was bypassed by the invading German soldiers in the beginning of Operation Barbarossa. The June massacre was stopped by German soldiers after Jewish women bribed them to intervene.

A subsequent massacre by Poles in July killed some 100 Jews, and following the German Gestapo takeover in August 1941 some 600 Jews were killed by the Germans, the remaining Jews placed in a ghetto, and subsequently sent to Treblinka extermination camp.

== Historical background ==
Some 56% of the town's 4,502 inhabitants were Jews prior to the war. At the outbreak of the Second World War Szczuczyn was briefly occupied by German forces, who sent 350 men, mostly Jewish, to forced labor. Only 30 returned after five months. The town was then taken by the Soviets, who arrested the wealthy residents of the town, including many Jews. Some twenty Jewish families were expelled to Siberia on 21 June 1941 and approximately 2,000 Jews remained in the town. The Soviets held control until the beginning of Operation Barbarossa in June 1941. The Germans, however, bypassed Szczuczyn in their advance eastwards leaving control of the town to the Polish locals.

== June massacre ==
On the night of the 25th of June Jews were murdered by Poles in three incidents. On the 28th of June axe-wielding mobs killed some three hundred Jews in a brutal massacre. The Polish mob killed entire families, focusing on wealthy families, and threw the corpses into anti-tank ditches near the town. The massacre is attested to by Chaye Soika-Golding, a local Jewish survivor, who details the massacre and the efforts of Jewish women to appeal to the local priests and Polish intelligentsia to stop the pogrom, which were refused. The women finally appealed to a passing German unit, who after receiving soap, coffee, and volunteer work by the women, intervened and halted the pogrom.

== July massacre ==
In July (on 24 or on Monday 14 or 28) 1941, Polish officers, on the orders of an SS officer, mobilized the local Polish population to participate in anti-Jewish violence. Armed with sticks, the Poles took some 2,500 Jews to the Jewish cemetery, where they were held prisoner while their homes were looted and burned. All but 100 men were released in the evening. Three more men were released later; 97 people were killed by the Polish police.

== Subsequent events ==
On 8 August 1941, the German Gestapo took control of the town. Some 600 Jews were murdered in the cemetery, and the surviving Jews were placed in a ghetto. On 2 November 1942 the Ghetto inhabitants were sent to the Bogusze transit camp, and from there on to Treblinka extermination camp.

In August 1941, a group of some 20 Jewish women from the Szczuczyn ghetto were raped, robbed, and killed by their Polish employers while employed in field work in Bzury. In a 1950 trial by communist authorities one man, Stanislaw Zalewski, was sentenced to death (later commuted to prison). The names or fates of six other killers, who were tried at the trial, are undetermined.

== See also ==
- Jedwabne pogrom
- Tykocin pogrom
- Wąsosz pogrom
