= 1947 anti-Jewish riots in Manama =

- Part of Jewish exodus from the Muslim world
- Location: Manama
- Date: December 5th 1947
- Target: Bahraini Jews, Foreigners, Christians
- Deaths: 1 Jewish Woman
- Injuries: 20
- Perpetrator: Baharna rioters
- Motive: Anti-Zionism, Labor Disputes, Antisemitism, Bahraini Nationalism

Contemporaneously with the 1947–48 Civil War in Mandatory Palestine, a riot against the Jewish community of Manama, in the British Protectorate of Bahrain, on December 5, 1947. A mob of Iranian and Trucial States sailors ran through the Manama Souq, looted Jewish homes and shops, and destroyed the synagogue. One Jewish woman died; she was either killed or died from fright.

== Background ==
Bahrain's tiny Jewish community, mostly the Jewish descendants of immigrants who entered the country in the early 1900s from Iraq, numbered 600 in 1948.

There was also lingering animosity between the Bahraini Arabs and the Jews because the jews were mostly immigrants, allied with the British, and had above average incomes. There was also animosity because the Bahraini Arabs were suspicious of the Jews and suspected them of being Zionists because while no Jews spoke out publicly in favor of Zionism they also didn't actively support Palestine like the Arab majority. Additionally in 1945 a group of 45 Zionist engineers arrived in Manama to help build a runway at an RAF airbase and to teach Zionism to the local Jews. While their attempts to convert the Jews were unsuccessful their presence was not unnoticed in the area and animosity developed between them and the local population began to view the Jews as competitors and oppressors.

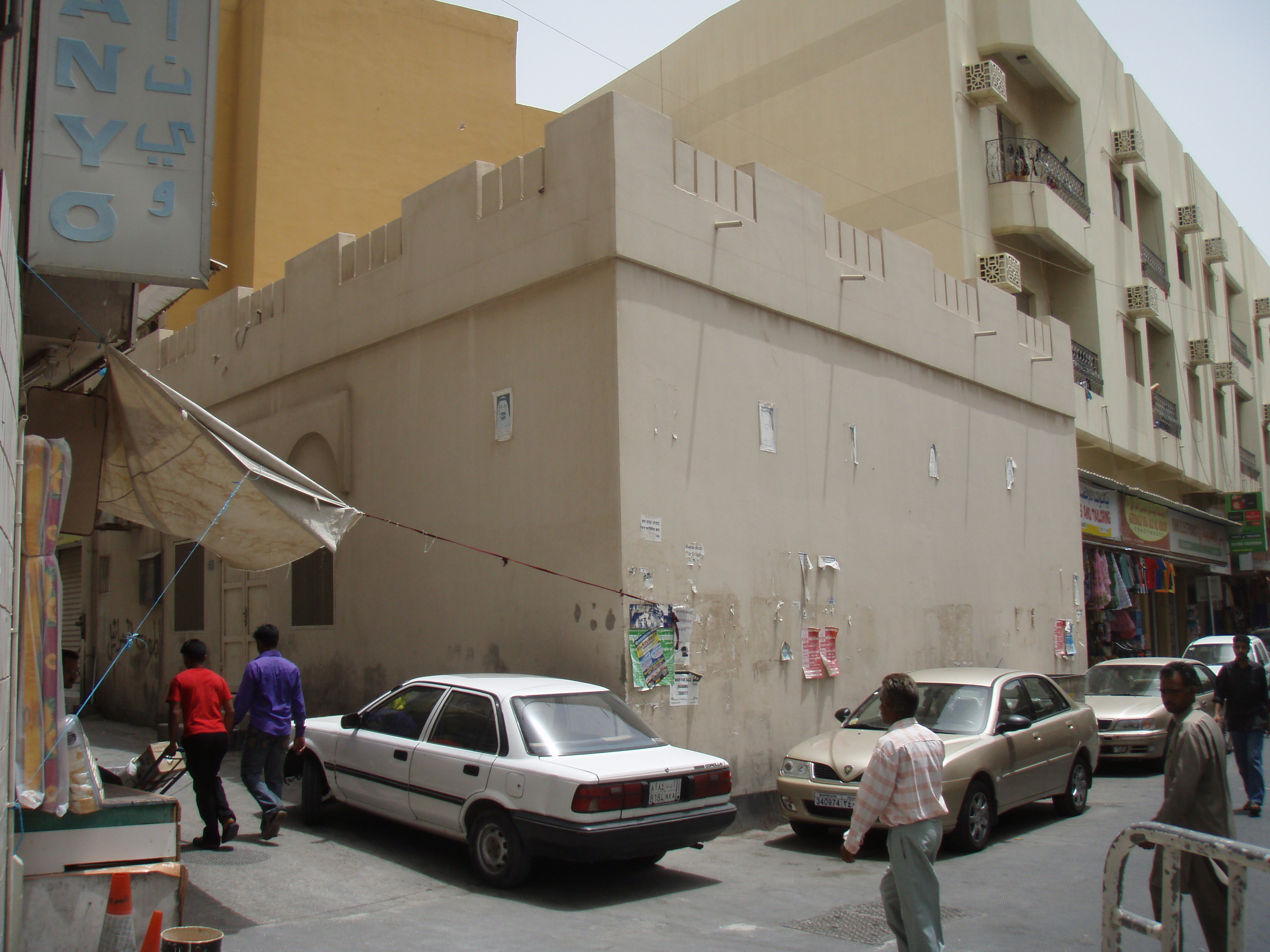
The synagogue in Manama, 2009.

== The riots ==
In the wake of the November 29, 1947 U.N. Partition vote, demonstrations against the vote in the Arab world were called for December 2–5. The first two days of demonstrations in Bahrain were made up of women, nationalists, and students and saw rocks and mud being thrown at Jews but things remained peaceful otherwise.

On the Third day, many workers and urban poor joined the demonstrations with the original demonstrators in the from being accompanied by police and a large crowd of workers and urban poor behind them without police. As the protesters passed the Bahrain Synagogue a riot broke out for unknown reasons.

The rioters looted 12 jewish homes and businesses, looted and burned the synagogue, desecrated the Torah scrolls, and attacked the local Jews killing 1 elderly Jewish woman and sending 20 Jews to the hospital. The rioters also threw mud at American Missionary and Iraqi Christians homes, and targeted some foreign owned buildings. The police intervened quickly in within a few hours the rioting had been stopped, local Jews blamed the riots on foreign Arabs.

== Jewish exodus from Bahrain ==
After the riots, Bahraini Jews left en masse, some emigrating to Israel, others to England or America. They were allowed to leave with their property, although they were forced to give up their citizenship. An estimated 500 to 600 Jews remained in Bahrain until riots broke out after the Six-Day War in 1967; as of 2006 only 36 remained.

== Objecting views on Bahraini state responsibility ==
Houda Nonoo told the London Independent newspaper in 2007: "I don't think it was Bahrainis who were responsible. It was people from abroad. Many Bahrainis looked after Jews in their houses." This view is supported by Sir Charles Belgrave, formerly a political adviser to the government of Bahrain – which at the time was subject to treaty relations with Britain – who recalled in a memoir: "The leading Arabs were very shocked ... most of them, when possible, had given shelter and protection to their Jewish neighbours... [the riots] had one surprising effect; it put an end to any active aggression by the Bahrain Arabs against the Bahrain Jews."

== See also ==
- Farhud
- 1945 Tripoli pogrom
- 1945 Cairo pogrom
