= Bogusze, Warmian-Masurian Voivodeship =

Bogusze
- Village
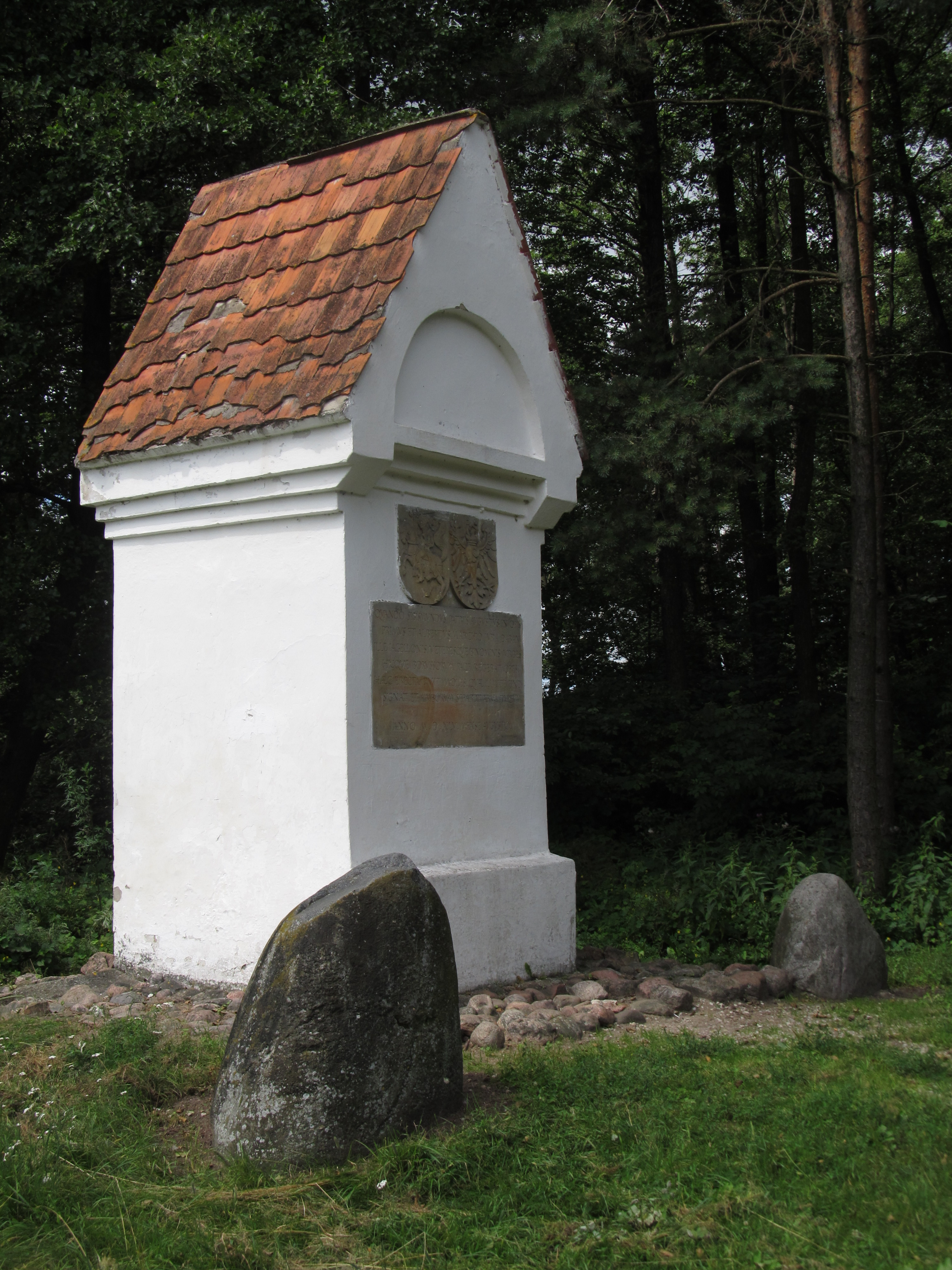

- Location within Poland
- Coordinates: 53°41′7″N 22°27′15″E
- Country: Poland
- Voivodeship: Warmian-Masurian
- County: Ełk
- Gmina: Prostki

Population
  - Total: 336
- Time zone: UTC+1 (CET)
  - Summer (DST): UTC+2 (CEST)
- Postal code: 19-335
- Area code: +48 87
- Vehicle registration: NEL

Bogusze [bɔˈɡuʂɛ] is a village in the administrative district of Gmina Prostki, within Ełk County, Warmian-Masurian Voivodeship, in north-eastern Poland.

== History ==
The village was established in 1438. It was a private village of Polish nobility, administratively located in the Wąsosz County in the Wizna Land in the Masovian Voivodeship in the Greater Poland Province of the Kingdom of Poland.

According to the 1921 census, the village with the adjacent manor farm had a population of 466, 98.5% Polish and 1.3% Jewish.

During the German occupation of Poland during World War II there was a German-operated prisoner-of-war camp in Bogusze. Polish civilians were also imprisoned in the camp. Many Russian and Italian soldiers as well as Polish civilians died of hunger or cold or were murdered in the camp. Many Italians were eventually relocated to other places, including forced labour camps and POW camps in Saxony, Łabędy, Schleswig, Hamburg, Luckenwalde, Zambrów. In 1959 a monument dedicated to the victims of German crimes was unveiled at the site.
