= Lipnik =

Lipnik or Lipník may refer to:

== Bosnia and Herzegovina ==
- Lipnik (Gacko), a village in the Gacko municipality
- Lipnik (Ilijaš), a village in the Ilijaš municipality

== Bulgaria ==
- Lipnik, a village in Razgrad Municipality

== Croatia ==
- Lipnik, Croatia, a village near Ribnik

== Czech Republic ==
- Lipník (Mladá Boleslav District), a municipality and village in the Central Bohemian Region
- Lipník (Třebíč District), a municipality and village in the Vysočina Region
- Lipník nad Bečvou, a town in the Olomouc Region

== Poland ==
- Lipnik, Bielsko-Biała, a district of Bielsko-Biała
- Lipnik, Gmina Grajewo in Podlaskie Voivodeship (north-east Poland)
- Lipnik, Gmina Szczuczyn in Podlaskie Voivodeship (north-east Poland)
- Lipnik, Łomża County in Podlaskie Voivodeship (north-east Poland)
- Lipnik, Łódź Voivodeship (central Poland)
- Lipnik, Lesser Poland Voivodeship (south Poland)
- Lipnik, Subcarpathian Voivodeship (south-east Poland)
- Lipnik, Opatów County in Świętokrzyskie Voivodeship (south-central Poland)
- Lipnik, Pińczów County in Świętokrzyskie Voivodeship (south-central Poland)
- Lipnik, Staszów County in Świętokrzyskie Voivodeship (south-central Poland)
- Lipnik, Silesian Voivodeship (south Poland)
- Lipnik, Pomeranian Voivodeship (north Poland)
- Lipnik, Warmian-Masurian Voivodeship (north Poland)
- Lipnik, West Pomeranian Voivodeship (north-west Poland)

== Russia ==
- Lipnik, Kursk Oblast, a village
- Lipnik, Cherepovetsky District, Vologda Oblast, a village

== Slovakia ==
- Lipník, Prievidza, a municipality and village in the Trenčín Region
- Malý Lipník, a municipality and village in the Prešov Region
- Veľký Lipník, a municipality and village in the Prešov Region

== Slovenia ==
- Lipnik, Trebnje, a settlement in the Municipality of Trebnje

== See also ==
- Lypnyky, a hamlet in Ukraine
