= Kurki (disambiguation) =

Kurki of Laukko refers to a Finnish noble family.

Kurki may also refer to:

== Places ==
- Kurki, Greater Poland Voivodeship (west-central Poland)
- Kurki, Kozienice County in Masovian Voivodeship (east-central Poland)
- Kurki, Mława County in Masovian Voivodeship (east-central Poland)
- Kurki, Gmina Grajewo in Podlaskie Voivodeship (north-east Poland)
- Kurki, Gmina Szczuczyn in Podlaskie Voivodeship (north-east Poland)
- Kurki, Działdowo County in Warmian-Masurian Voivodeship (north Poland)
- Kurki, Olsztyn County in Warmian-Masurian Voivodeship (north Poland)
- Korki, North Khorasan, Iran

== Other uses ==
- Kurki (surname), including a list of people with the name
