= Flesze =

- Village
- Location within Poland
- Coordinates: 53°39′N 22°23′E
- Country: Poland
- Voivodeship: Podlaskie
- County: Grajewo
- Gmina: Grajewo

Population
  - Total: 56
- Time zone: UTC+1 (CET)
  - Summer (DST): UTC+2 (CEST)
- Vehicle registration: BGR

Flesze [ˈflɛʂɛ] is a village in the administrative district of Gmina Grajewo, within Grajewo County, Podlaskie Voivodeship, in north-eastern Poland.

It was a private village of Polish nobility, administratively located in the Wąsosz County in the Wizna Land in the Masovian Voivodeship in the Greater Poland Province of the Kingdom of Poland.
