= Szymany =

Szymany may refer to the following places:

- Szymany, Greater Poland Voivodeship (west-central Poland)
- Szymany, Gmina Grajewo in Podlaskie Voivodeship (north-east Poland)
- Szymany, Gmina Wąsosz in Podlaskie Voivodeship (north-east Poland)
- Szymany, Nidzica County in Warmian-Masurian Voivodeship (north Poland)
- Szymany, Szczytno County in Warmian-Masurian Voivodeship (north Poland)

== See also ==
- Szczytno-Szymany International Airport
