= Kazimierz Gwiazdowski =

Polish politician (born 1962)

Member of the Sejm from Białystok parliamentary constituency
- In office 2019–Incumbent

Personal details
- Born: 10 June 1962 (age 63) Radziłów, Polish People's Republic
- Citizenship: Poland
- Party: Law and Justice
- Education: Water Melioration Technical School in Białystok
- Occupation: Politician

Kazimierz Gwiazdowski (born June 10, 1962, in Radziłów) is a Polish politician, farmer and local government official, member of the Sejm of the 5th, 6th, 8th and 9th term.

== Biography ==
He has secondary technical education (in 1982 he graduated from the Technical Secondary School of Water Reclamation in Białystok, and previously from 1969 to 1977 he attended the Primary School in Mścichy). Until 1984, he worked at the District Melioration Company in Grajewo, and then at a farm, which he became the owner of in 1986. From 1988 to 1991, he was the village head of Mścichy. In the years 1990–2006 he served as the head of the Gmina Radziłów . In the early 1990s, he was also a councilor of this commune. He was also a councilor of the Podlaskie Voivodeship Sejmik of the 1st term (1998–2002) from the Solidarity Electoral Action list.

In the years 1991–1996 he was the president of the municipal board of the Volunteer Fire Department in Radziłów. He also held, among others, as the president of the Znicz Radziałów Rural Sports Club and the chairman of the Association of Local Governments of the Biebrza River Basin.

In the parliamentary elections in 2001 and 2005, he ran for the Sejm from the Law and Justice list in the Podlaskie constituency, but did not win a seat. In the local elections in 2006, he was re-elected as mayor and to the local council. He resigned from both of these positions shortly after the elections, replacing Roman Czepe in the Sejm, who resigned from his parliamentary mandate due to his election as mayor of Łapy.

In the 2007 parliamentary elections, he won a parliamentary seat for the second time, receiving 7,545 votes. He was not re-elected in 2011. In 2014, he returned to the Podlaskie assembly on behalf of PiS. In 2015, he was re-elected to the Sejm, receiving 6,787 votes. In the 2019 elections, he successfully ran for parliamentary re-election, receiving 14,101 votes. In 2022, appointed as a representative of one of the PiS districts in the Podlaskie Voivodeship.
