= Konopki =

Konopki may refer to the following places:

- Konopki, Gmina Grajewo in Podlaskie Voivodeship (north-east Poland)
- Konopki, Gmina Radziłów in Podlaskie Voivodeship (north-east Poland)
- Konopki, Suwałki County in Podlaskie Voivodeship (north-east Poland)
- Konopki, Masovian Voivodeship (east-central Poland)
- Konopki, Warmian-Masurian Voivodeship (north Poland)
