= Modzele =

Modzele may refer to the following places:

- Modzele, Masovian Voivodeship (east-central Poland)
- Modzele, Gmina Grajewo in Podlaskie Voivodeship (north-east Poland)
- Modzele, Gmina Wąsosz in Podlaskie Voivodeship (north-east Poland)
