= Koniecki-Rostroszewo =

- Village
- Location within Poland
- Coordinates: 53°34′22″N 22°15′54″E
- Country: Poland
- Voivodeship: Podlaskie
- County: Grajewo
- Gmina: Szczuczyn

Koniecki-Rostroszewo [kɔˈɲɛt͡ski rɔstrɔˈʂɛvɔ] is a village in the administrative district of Gmina Szczuczyn, within Grajewo County, Podlaskie Voivodeship, in north-eastern Poland.
