= Łempice, Grajewo County =

Łempice
- Village
- Location within Poland
- Coordinates: 53°32′N 22°17′E
- Country: Poland
- Voivodeship: Podlaskie
- County: Grajewo
- Gmina: Wąsosz

Łempice [wɛmˈpit͡sɛ] is a village in the administrative district of Gmina Wąsosz, within Grajewo County, Podlaskie Voivodeship, in north-eastern Poland.
