= Popowo, Grajewo County =

Popowo
- Village
- Location within Poland
- Coordinates: 53°33′27″N 22°32′04″E
- Country: Poland
- Voivodeship: Podlaskie
- County: Grajewo
- Gmina: Grajewo

Popowo [pɔˈpɔvɔ] is a village in the administrative district of Gmina Grajewo, within Grajewo County, Podlaskie Voivodeship, in north-eastern Poland.
