= Dusze =

- Village
- Location within Poland
- Coordinates: 53°22′31″N 22°23′14″E
- Country: Poland
- Voivodeship: Podlaskie
- County: Grajewo
- Gmina: Radziłów

Dusze [ˈduʂɛ] is a village in the administrative district of Gmina Radziłów, within Grajewo County, Podlaskie Voivodeship, in north-eastern Poland.
