= Sikora, Podlaskie Voivodeship =

Sikora
- Village
- Location within Poland
- Coordinates: 53°32′02″N 22°29′04″E
- Country: Poland
- Voivodeship: Podlaskie
- County: Grajewo
- Gmina: Grajewo
- Population: 40

Sikora [ɕiˈkɔra] is a village in the administrative district of Gmina Grajewo, within Grajewo County, Podlaskie Voivodeship, in north-eastern Poland.
