= Stare Guty =

Stare Guty may refer to the following places:

- Stare Guty, Grajewo County in Podlaskie Voivodeship (north-east Poland)
- Stare Guty, Kolno County in Podlaskie Voivodeship (north-east Poland)
- Stare Guty, Warmian-Masurian Voivodeship (north Poland)
