= Bęćkowo =

- Village
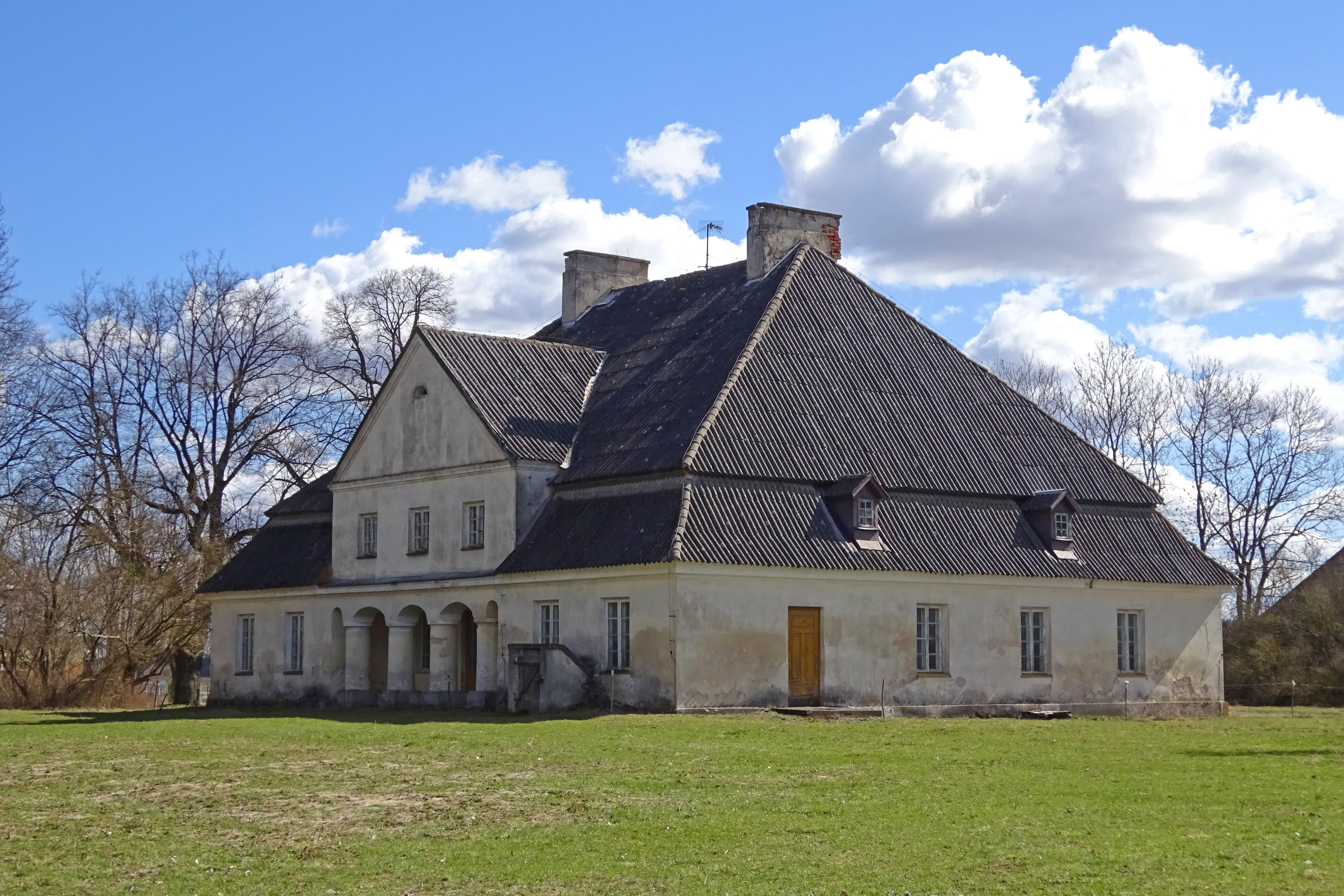

- Location within Poland
- Coordinates: 53°36′19″N 22°18′59″E
- Country: Poland
- Voivodeship: Podlaskie
- County: Grajewo
- Gmina: Szczuczyn

Bęćkowo [bɛnt͡ɕˈkɔvɔ] is a village in the administrative district of Gmina Szczuczyn, within Grajewo County, Podlaskie Voivodeship, in north-eastern Poland.
