= Święcienin-Kolonia =

- Village
- Location within Poland
- Coordinates: 53°27′04″N 22°28′20″E
- Country: Poland
- Voivodeship: Podlaskie
- County: Grajewo
- Gmina: Radziłów

Święcienin-Kolonia (Polish pronunciation: [ɕfjɛɲˈt͡ɕɛɲin kɔˈlɔɲa]) is a village in the administrative district of Gmina Radziłów, within Grajewo County, Podlaskie Voivodeship, in north-eastern Poland.
