= Zofiówka, Grajewo County =

Zofiówka
- Village
- Location within Poland
- Coordinates: 53°33′06″N 22°12′12″E
- Country: Poland
- Voivodeship: Podlaskie
- County: Grajewo
- Gmina: Szczuczyn

Zofiówka [zɔˈfjufka] is a village in the administrative district of Gmina Szczuczyn, within Grajewo County, Podlaskie Voivodeship, in north-eastern Poland.
