= Tytus Chałubiński =

Polish physician

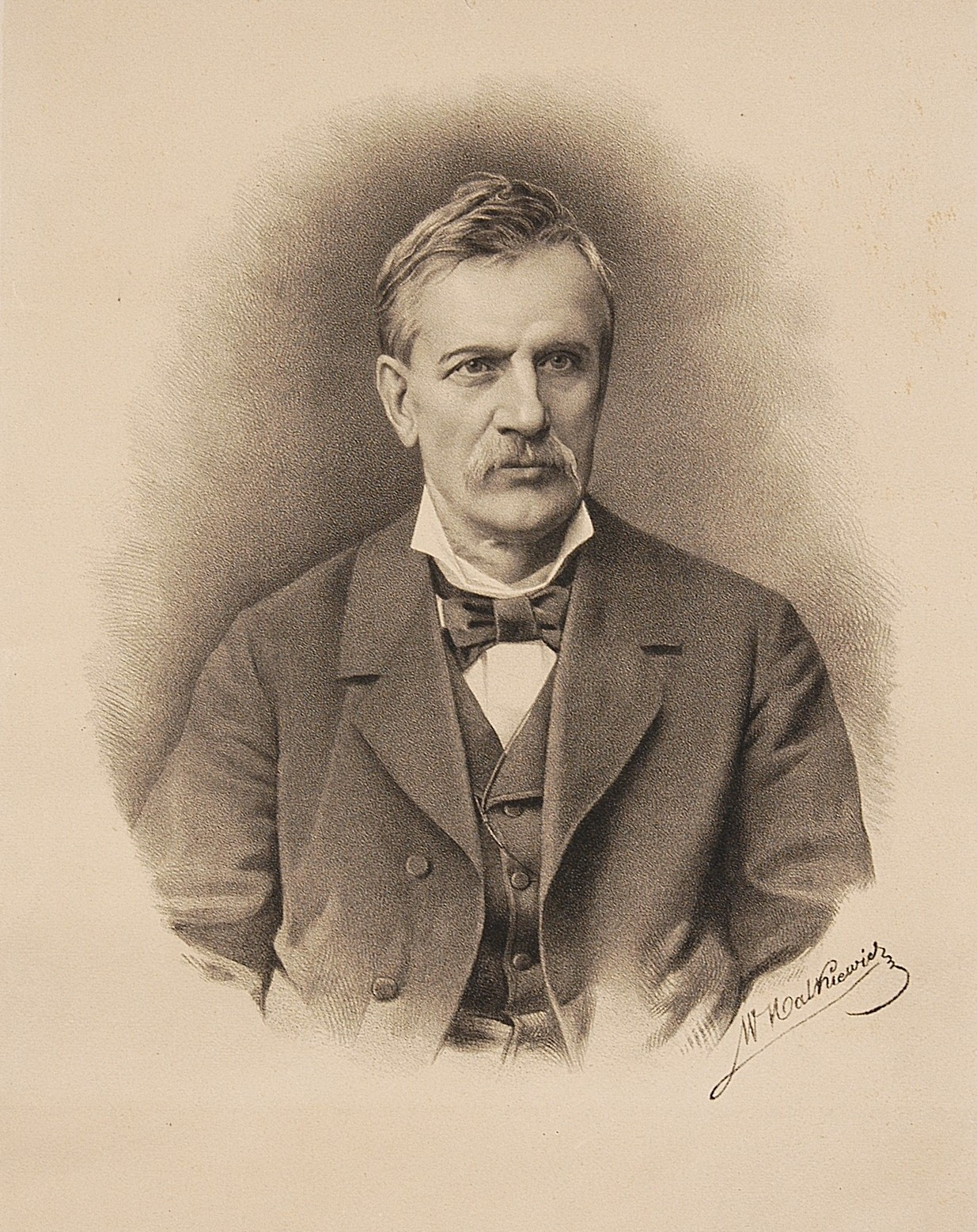
- Born: 29 December 1820; Radom or Białogrądy, Congress Poland, Russian Empire
- Died: 4 November 1889 (aged 68); Zakopane, Kingdom of Galicia and Lodomeria, Austria-Hungary
- Occupations: Physician and co-founder of the Polish Tatra Society

Tytus Aureliusz Chałubiński (29 December 1820, Radom – 4 November 1889, Zakopane) was a Polish medical doctor, naturalist, and co-founder of the Polish Tatra Society. His collections of natural history specimens are now held in the Tatra Mountains Museum in Zakopane.

== Life and work ==
Chałubiński was born in Radom (some biographers give it as Bialograj where his grandfather lived), son of judge Szymon. His mother Theodosia came from the Wnorowski family of nobles. He studied medicine at Vilnius from 1838, the medical school there had been founded by Jedrzej Sniadecki (1768-1838) and his writings on physiological chemistry would have been an influence. The school was closed in 1840 and in the same year his mother lost all her wealth and she committed suicide. He moved to Dorpat wrote his thesis on sexual reproduction in plants and completed his medical studies at the University of Würzburg. He returned to Warsaw and practiced at the clinic of the Evangelic Hospital under Ferdynand Dworzaczek (1804-1877) whose clinical techniques were another influence. Chałubiński's practice was disturbed during the Polish insurrection of 1863 and ended with Russification in 1873. He then spent time on botany and mineralogy spending time in the Tatra mountains. He helped in promoting the Zakopane region. He collected numerous specimens of mosses, algae, and other plants.

In 1874 he published a book on identifying therapeutic indications. He considered disease to be a disturbance in the normal equilibrium and sough a holistic approach to treatment and health. He considered each patient to be unique and suggested that a physician needs to deal with symptoms carefully dealing with multiple symptoms starting with the most important one first.

Chałubiński established tuberculosis sanatoria in Zakopane, in the Tatra Mountains. He was a professor at the Medical-Surgical Academy and Principal School in Warsaw.

== Personal life ==
Chałubiński's son was Ludwik Chałubiński, a Polish alpinist and chemical engineer. His granddaughter was Aniela Chałubińska was a Polish geographer, geologist and university professor.

== Other sources ==
- Stefan Kieniewicz, Andrzej Zahorski, Władysław Zajewski, Trzy powstania narodowe, 1992, 300 pages
- Biographisches Lexikon hervorragender Ärzte des neunzehnten Jahrhunderts (Sp. 315). Berlin-Wiedeń. 1901.
- Stanisław Feliksiak, Słownik biologów polskich, 1987, Państwowe Wydawnictwo Naukowe, Warsaw, ISBN 83-01-00656-0, pp. 94–95
