= Niećkowo =

- Village
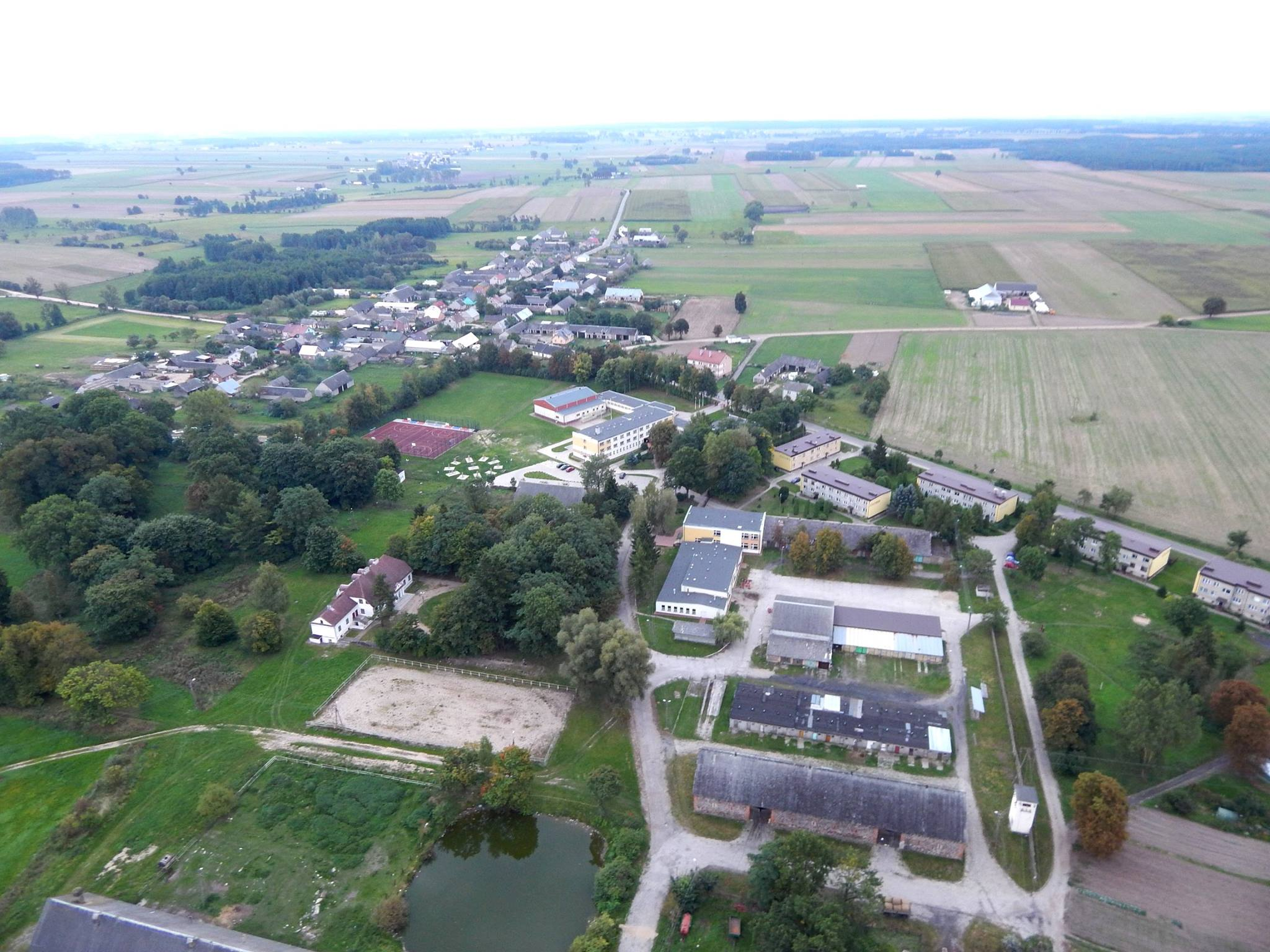
- Aerial view of Niećkowo

- Location within Poland
- Coordinates: 53°33′2″N 22°21′18″E
- Country: Poland
- Voivodeship: Podlaskie
- County: Grajewo
- Gmina: Szczuczyn
- Time zone: UTC+1 (CET)
  - Summer (DST): UTC+2 (CEST)
- Vehicle registration: BGR

Niećkowo [ɲɛt͡ɕˈkɔvɔ] is a village in the administrative district of Gmina Szczuczyn, within Grajewo County, Podlaskie Voivodeship, in north-eastern Poland.
