= Racibory, Podlaskie Voivodeship =

Racibory
- Village
- Location within Poland
- Coordinates: 53°24′N 22°26′E
- Country: Poland
- Voivodeship: Podlaskie
- County: Grajewo
- Gmina: Radziłów
- Population: <100

Racibory [rat͡ɕiˈbɔrɨ] is a village in the administrative district of Gmina Radziłów, within Grajewo County, Podlaskie Voivodeship, in north-eastern Poland.
