= Niedźwiedzkie, Podlaskie Voivodeship =

Niedźwiedzkie
- Village
- Location within Poland
- Coordinates: 53°33′59″N 22°22′17″E
- Country: Poland
- Voivodeship: Podlaskie
- County: Grajewo
- Gmina: Szczuczyn

Niedźwiedzkie [ɲɛd͡ʑˈvjɛt͡skʲɛ] is a village in the administrative district of Gmina Szczuczyn, within Grajewo County, Podlaskie Voivodeship, in north-eastern Poland.
