= Kurejewka =

- Village
- Location within Poland
- Coordinates: 53°37′N 22°21′E
- Country: Poland
- Voivodeship: Podlaskie
- County: Grajewo
- Gmina: Grajewo
- Postal code: 19-200
- Vehicle registration: BGR

Kurejewka [kurɛˈjɛfka] is a village in the administrative district of Gmina Grajewo, within Grajewo County, Podlaskie Voivodeship, in north-eastern Poland.

Four Polish citizens were murdered by Nazi Germany in the village during World War II.
