= Wierzbowo, Grajewo County =

Wierzbowo
- Village
- Location within Poland
- Coordinates: 53°36′N 22°24′E
- Country: Poland
- Voivodeship: Podlaskie
- County: Grajewo
- Gmina: Grajewo

Wierzbowo [vjɛʐˈbɔvɔ] is a village in the administrative district of Gmina Grajewo, within Grajewo County, Podlaskie Voivodeship, in north-eastern Poland.
