= Kramarzewo, Podlaskie Voivodeship =

Kramarzewo
- Village
- Location within Poland
- Coordinates: 53°28′N 22°26′E
- Country: Poland
- Voivodeship: Podlaskie
- County: Grajewo
- Gmina: Radziłów
- Population (approx.): 60

Kramarzewo [kramaˈʐɛvɔ] is a village in the administrative district of Gmina Radziłów, within Grajewo County, Podlaskie Voivodeship, in north-eastern Poland.
