= Sokoły, Grajewo County =

Sokoły
- Village
- Location within Poland
- Coordinates: 53°35′10″N 22°16′17″E
- Country: Poland
- Voivodeship: Podlaskie
- County: Grajewo
- Gmina: Szczuczyn
- Population (approx.): 60

Sokoły [sɔˈkɔwɨ] is a village in the administrative district of Gmina Szczuczyn, within Grajewo County, Podlaskie Voivodeship, in north-eastern Poland.
