= Ciemnoszyje =

- Village
- Location within Poland
- Coordinates: 53°33′N 22°34′E
- Country: Poland
- Voivodeship: Podlaskie
- County: Grajewo
- Gmina: Grajewo

Ciemnoszyje [t͡ɕɛmnɔˈʂɨjɛ] is a village in the administrative district of Gmina Grajewo, within Grajewo County, Podlaskie Voivodeship, in north-eastern Poland.
