= Okrasin, Podlaskie Voivodeship =

Okrasin
- Village
- Location within Poland
- Coordinates: 53°25′N 22°29′E
- Country: Poland
- Voivodeship: Podlaskie
- County: Grajewo
- Gmina: Radziłów

Okrasin [ɔˈkraɕin] is a village in the administrative district of Gmina Radziłów, within Grajewo County, Podlaskie Voivodeship, in north-eastern Poland.
