= Białogrądy-Kolonia =

Settlement in Gmina Grajewo, Poland

- Settlement
- Location within Poland
- Coordinates: 53°30′3″N 22°35′38″E
- Country: Poland
- Voivodeship: Podlaskie
- County: Grajewo
- Gmina: Grajewo

Białogrądy-Kolonia [bjawɔˈɡrɔndɨ kɔˈlɔɲa] is a settlement in the administrative district of Gmina Grajewo, within Grajewo County, Podlaskie Voivodeship, in north-eastern Poland.
