= Żebry, Grajewo County =

Żebry
- Village
- Location within Poland
- Coordinates: 53°28′52″N 22°22′3″E
- Country: Poland
- Voivodeship: Podlaskie
- County: Grajewo
- Gmina: Wąsosz

Żebry [ˈʐɛbrɨ] is a village in the administrative district of Gmina Wąsosz, within Grajewo County, Podlaskie Voivodeship, in north-eastern Poland.
