= Wypychy, Grajewo County =

Wypychy
- Village
- Location within Poland
- Coordinates: 53°22′42″N 22°21′58″E
- Country: Poland
- Voivodeship: Podlaskie
- County: Grajewo
- Gmina: Radziłów
- Population: 83

Wypychy [vɨˈpɨxɨ] is a village in the administrative district of Gmina Radziłów, within Grajewo County, Podlaskie Voivodeship, in north-eastern Poland.
