= Konopki-Kolonie =

- Village
- Location within Poland
- Coordinates: 53°34′02″N 22°35′07″E
- Country: Poland
- Voivodeship: Podlaskie
- County: Grajewo
- Gmina: Grajewo

Konopki-Kolonie [kɔˈnɔpki kɔˈlɔɲɛ] is a village in the administrative district of Gmina Grajewo, within Grajewo County, Podlaskie Voivodeship, in north-eastern Poland.
