= Brzozowa, Grajewo County =

Brzozowa
- Village
- Location within Poland
- Coordinates: 53°36′01″N 22°23′07″E
- Country: Poland
- Voivodeship: Podlaskie
- County: Grajewo
- Gmina: Grajewo

Brzozowa [bʐɔˈzɔva] is a village in the administrative district of Gmina Grajewo, within Grajewo County, Podlaskie Voivodeship, in north-eastern Poland.
