= Rydzewo-Pieniążek =

- Village
- Location within Poland
- Coordinates: 53°27′N 22°22′E
- Country: Poland
- Voivodeship: Podlaskie
- County: Grajewo
- Gmina: Radziłów

Population
  - Total: 110
- Postal code: 19-213
- Vehicle registration: BGR

Rydzewo-Pieniążek [rɨˈd͡zɛvɔ pjɛˈɲɔ̃ʐɛk] is a village in the administrative district of Gmina Radziłów, within Grajewo County, Podlaskie Voivodeship, in north-eastern Poland.

Five Polish citizens were murdered by Nazi Germany in the village during World War II.
