= Nieciki =

- Village
- Location within Poland
- Coordinates: 53°28′N 22°16′E
- Country: Poland
- Voivodeship: Podlaskie
- County: Grajewo
- Gmina: Wąsosz

Nieciki [ɲɛˈt͡ɕiki] is a village in the administrative district of Gmina Wąsosz, within Grajewo County, Podlaskie Voivodeship, in north-eastern Poland.
