= Brodowo, Podlaskie Voivodeship =

Brodowo
- Village
- Location within Poland
- Coordinates: 53°24′N 22°25′E
- Country: Poland
- Voivodeship: Podlaskie
- County: Grajewo
- Gmina: Radziłów

Brodowo [brɔˈdɔvɔ] is a village in the administrative district of Gmina Radziłów, within Grajewo County, Podlaskie Voivodeship, in north-eastern Poland.
