= Barwiki =

- Village
- Location within Poland
- Coordinates: 53°23′N 22°26′E
- Country: Poland
- Voivodeship: Podlaskie
- County: Grajewo
- Gmina: Radziłów

Barwiki [barˈviki] is a village in the administrative district of Gmina Radziłów, within Grajewo County, Podlaskie Voivodeship, in north-eastern Poland.

== History ==
The name of the town comes from the word "dye" or from a word denoting a plant species. According to researchers, this name is of Prussian origin and indicates early medieval Prussian settlement in this area.
