= Glinki, Grajewo County =

Glinki
- Village
- Location within Poland
- Coordinates: 53°24′58″N 22°18′21″E
- Country: Poland
- Voivodeship: Podlaskie
- County: Grajewo
- Gmina: Radziłów

Glinki [ˈɡlinki] is a village in the administrative district of Gmina Radziłów, within Grajewo County, Podlaskie Voivodeship, in northeastern Poland.
