= Podlasek, Podlaskie Voivodeship =

Podlasek
- Settlement
- Location within Poland
- Coordinates: 53°33′26″N 22°32′5″E
- Country: Poland
- Voivodeship: Podlaskie
- County: Grajewo
- Gmina: Grajewo
- Time zone: UTC+1 (CET)
  - Summer (DST): UTC+2 (CEST)
- Vehicle registration: BGR

Podlasek [pɔdˈlasɛk] is a settlement in the administrative district of Gmina Grajewo, within Grajewo County, Podlaskie Voivodeship, in north-eastern Poland.

== History ==
During World War II, the settlement was occupied by the Soviet Union from 1939 to 1941, and by Nazi Germany from 1941 to 1944. In 1943, the Germans established a forced labour camp in the village. Around 2,300 men from the region passed through the camp until its dissolution in July 1944.

== Transport ==
There is a train station in the village.
