= Tarachy =

- Village
- Location within Poland
- Coordinates: 53°32′45″N 22°18′37″E
- Country: Poland
- Voivodeship: Podlaskie
- County: Grajewo
- Gmina: Szczuczyn

Tarachy [taˈraxɨ] is a village in the administrative district of Gmina Szczuczyn, within Grajewo County, Podlaskie Voivodeship, in north-eastern Poland.
