= Koty-Rybno =

- Village
- Location within Poland
- Coordinates: 53°37′09″N 22°29′01″E
- Country: Poland
- Voivodeship: Podlaskie
- County: Grajewo
- Gmina: Grajewo

Koty-Rybno [ˈkɔtɨ ˈrɨbnɔ] is a village in the administrative district of Gmina Grajewo, within Grajewo County, Podlaskie Voivodeship, in north-eastern Poland.
