= Bagienice, Grajewo County =

Bagienice
- Village
- Location within Poland
- Coordinates: 53°32′N 22°24′E
- Country: Poland
- Voivodeship: Podlaskie
- County: Grajewo
- Gmina: Wąsosz

Bagienice (Polish pronunciation: [baɡʲɛˈɲitsɛ]) is a village in the administrative district of Gmina Wąsosz, within Grajewo County, Podlaskie Voivodeship, in north-eastern Poland.
