= Przeszkoda, Podlaskie Voivodeship =

Przeszkoda
- Village
- Location within Poland
- Coordinates: 53°37′33″N 22°16′44″E
- Country: Poland
- Voivodeship: Podlaskie
- County: Grajewo
- Gmina: Szczuczyn

Przeszkoda [pʂɛʂˈkɔda] is a village in the administrative district of Gmina Szczuczyn, within Grajewo County, Podlaskie Voivodeship, in north-eastern Poland.
