= Lekowo =

Lekowo may refer to the following places in Poland:

- Lekowo, Masovian Voivodeship
- Lekowo, West Pomeranian Voivodeship
- Łękowo, Podlaskie Voivodeship
