= Łoje-Gręzko =

Village in Gmina Radziłów, Poland

- Village
- Location within Poland
- Coordinates: 53°22′29″N 22°27′03″E
- Country: Poland
- Voivodeship: Podlaskie
- County: Grajewo
- Gmina: Radziłów

Łoje-Gręzko [ˈwɔjɛ ˈɡrɛ̃skɔ] is a village in the administrative district of Gmina Radziłów, within Grajewo County, Podlaskie Voivodeship, in north-eastern Poland.
