= Elżbiecin, Grajewo County =

Elżbiecin
- Village
- Location within Poland
- Coordinates: 53°36′54″N 22°27′51″E
- Country: Poland
- Voivodeship: Podlaskie
- County: Grajewo
- Gmina: Grajewo

Elżbiecin [ɛlʐˈbjɛt͡ɕin] is a village in the administrative district of Gmina Grajewo, within Grajewo County, Podlaskie Voivodeship, in north-eastern Poland.
