= Sienickie =

- Village
- Location within Poland
- Coordinates: 53°32′N 22°29′E
- Country: Poland
- Voivodeship: Podlaskie
- County: Grajewo
- Gmina: Grajewo

Sienickie [ɕɛˈnit͡skʲɛ] is a village in the administrative district of Gmina Grajewo, within Grajewo County, Podlaskie Voivodeship, in north-eastern Poland.
