= Kolonia-Łazy =

Village in Gmina Wąsosz, Poland

- Village
- Location within Poland
- Coordinates: 53°29′09″N 22°17′09″E
- Country: Poland
- Voivodeship: Podlaskie
- County: Grajewo
- Gmina: Wąsosz

Kolonia-Łazy [kɔˈlɔɲa ˈwazɨ] is a village in the administrative district of Gmina Wąsosz, within Grajewo County, Podlaskie Voivodeship, in north-eastern Poland.
