= Mieczysław Kosmowski =

Polish Nazi collaborator (born 1913)

- Born: 1913; Świdry, Poland
- Disappeared: 1944 (aged 30–31); Bydgoszcz, Poland
- Status: Most likely dead
- Other names: Walter Krause, Gienek
- Occupation: collaborator
- Known for: being a war criminal

Mieczysław Kosmowski (born 1913; disappeared 1944) was a Polish Nazi collaborator, Gestapo agent and war criminal.

== Career and disappearance ==
Kosmowski served in the army in 1933 before working at a family farm. He was later employed at a post office in Szczuczyn. In 1940, during World War II, he committed financial fraud and fled to the German occupation zone. The Gestapo recruited Kosmowski on 30 October 1940 to cooperate with German intelligence and he was given the undercover name of Walter Krause. Kosmowski became a post office employee, and is believed to have been assigned the function of the chief of the Blue Police, (but since he was one of three brothers, it is not certain whether he was the one who became the police chief) and served as the agent of the German Security Police. One of his tasks was to incite hatred towards Jews among the local population. On 27 and 28 June 1941, a group of Poles assembled by Peniuk and the Kosmowski brothers assaulted Jews at four locations in the town. Around 300–400 people were brutally murdered.

The Białystok prosecutor's office is in possession of the original document of recruitment carried out by the Gestapo in Olsztyn. Until the German-Soviet war, Kosmowski crossed the border several times. He was last seen in 1944 in Bydgoszcz, when he evacuated with the German army. He withdrew from the German army as he was preparing to evacuate to Germany together with his masters from the Gestapo. In 1955, he was accused of denouncing several Poles to the Germans and a wanted poster was issued for him in 1957, and at the request of the court after a warrant was issued, which was valid from 1957 until 2009.

== Investigation and aftermath ==
In 2009, the prosecutors of the Białystok division of the Polish Institute of National Remembrance said Kosmowski was possibly involved in instigating the Wąsocz pogrom, Jedwabne pogrom, Szczuczyn pogrom and Łomża pogrom. According to the IPN, he operated under the codename "Gienek". The government ceased its search in 2009.

== Bibliography ==
- Adam Białous (11 July 2009). "Niemcy płacili i za pogromy, i za denuncjację polskich żołnierzy". Nasz Dziennik (in Polish).

== See also ==
- List of fugitives from justice who disappeared
