= Ławsk =

- Village
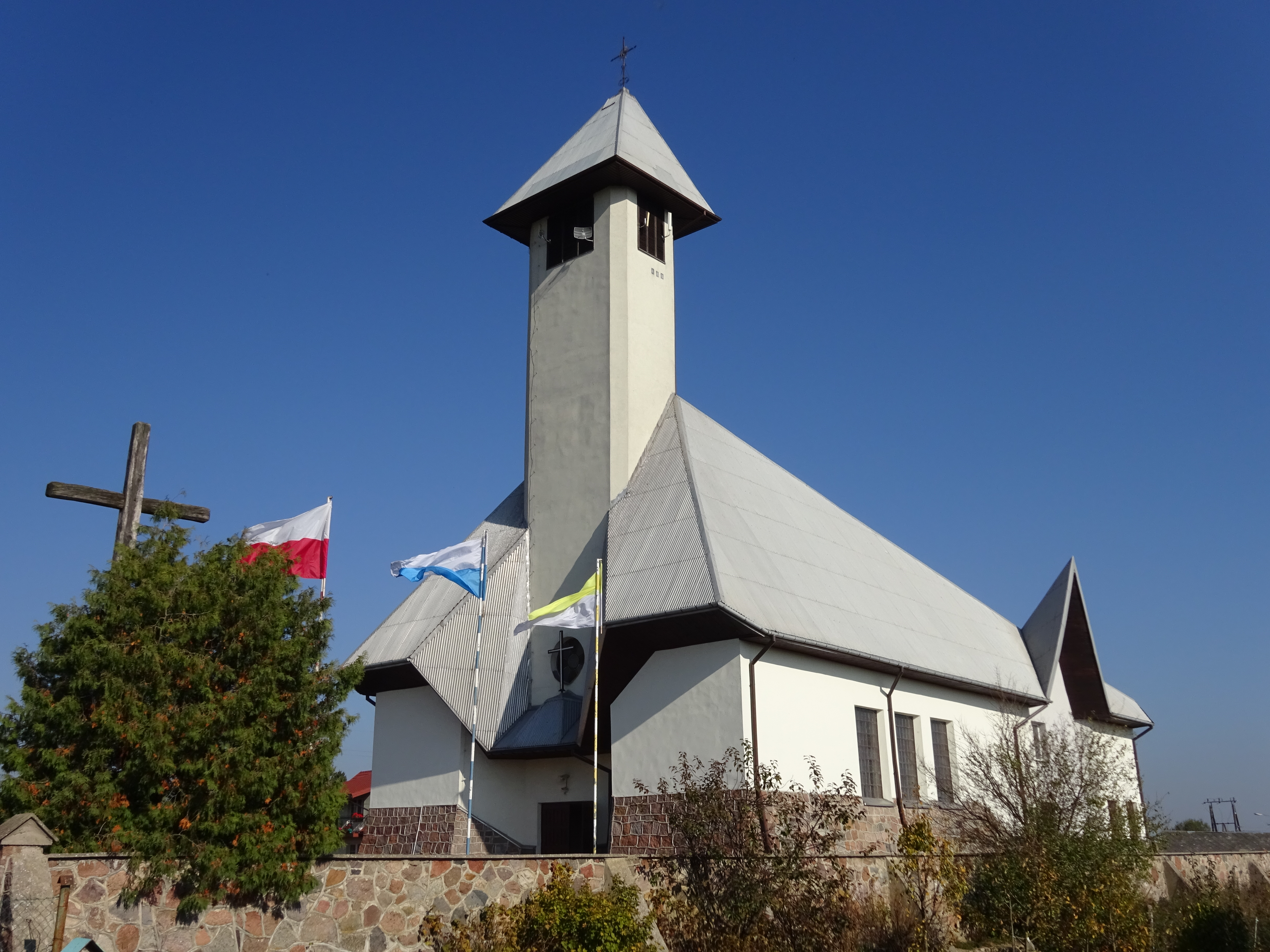
- Blessed Virgin Mary of Częstochowa church in Ławsk

- Location within Poland
- Coordinates: 53°29′N 22°17′E
- Country: Poland
- Voivodeship: Podlaskie
- County: Grajewo
- Gmina: Wąsosz

Population
  - Total: 760
- Time zone: UTC+1 (CET)
  - Summer (DST): UTC+2 (CEST)

Ławsk [wafsk] is a village in the administrative district of Gmina Wąsosz, within Grajewo County, Podlaskie Voivodeship, in north-eastern Poland.

== History ==
Three Polish citizens were murdered by Nazi Germany in the village during World War II.
