= Gutki =

- Village
- Location within Poland
- Coordinates: 53°33′07″N 22°14′10″E
- Country: Poland
- Voivodeship: Podlaskie
- County: Grajewo
- Gmina: Szczuczyn

Gutki [ˈɡutki] is a village in the administrative district of Gmina Szczuczyn, within Grajewo County, Podlaskie Voivodeship, in northeastern Poland.

== Population ==
The population of Gutki in 2021 was 29.
