= Kudłaczewo =

- Village
- Location within Poland
- Coordinates: 53°33′N 22°25′E
- Country: Poland
- Voivodeship: Podlaskie
- County: Grajewo
- Gmina: Wąsosz
- Time zone: UTC+1 (CET)
  - Summer (DST): UTC+2 (CEST)
- Postal code: 19-222
- Vehicle registration: BGR

Kudłaczewo [kudwaˈt͡ʂɛvɔ] is a village in the administrative district of Gmina Wąsosz, within Grajewo County, Podlaskie Voivodeship, in north-eastern Poland. It is located in the historic region of Mazovia.

== History ==
In the interwar period, it was administratively located in Gmina Wąsosz in the Szczuczyn County in the Białystok Voivodeship of Poland. According to the 1921 census, Kudłaczewo had a population of 94, entirely Polish by nationality and Roman Catholic by confession.

Following the German-Soviet invasion of Poland, which started World War II in September 1939, the village was occupied by the Soviet Union until 1941, and then by Nazi Germany until 1944. The Germans operated a forced labour camp for Jews in the village.
