= Koszarówka =

- Village
- Location within Poland
- Coordinates: 53°37′03″N 22°29′05″E
- Country: Poland
- Voivodeship: Podlaskie
- County: Grajewo
- Gmina: Grajewo

Koszarówka [kɔʂaˈrufka] is a village in the administrative district of Gmina Grajewo, within Grajewo County, Podlaskie Voivodeship, in north-eastern Poland.
