= Bukowo Duże =

- Village
- Location within Poland
- Coordinates: 53°29′N 22°22′E
- Country: Poland
- Voivodeship: Podlaskie
- County: Grajewo
- Gmina: Wąsosz

Bukowo Duże [buˈkɔvɔ ˈduʐɛ] is a village in the administrative district of Gmina Wąsosz, within Grajewo County, Podlaskie Voivodeship, in north-eastern Poland.
