= Szyjki =

- Village
- Location within Poland
- Coordinates: 53°27′40″N 22°28′31″E
- Country: Poland
- Voivodeship: Podlaskie
- County: Grajewo
- Gmina: Radziłów

Szyjki [ˈʂɨi̯ki] is a village in the administrative district of Gmina Radziłów, within Grajewo County, Podlaskie Voivodeship, in north-eastern Poland.
