= Szymany-Kolonie =

- Village
- Location within Poland
- Coordinates: 53°30′35″N 22°32′36″E
- Country: Poland
- Voivodeship: Podlaskie
- County: Grajewo
- Gmina: Grajewo

Szymany-Kolonie (Polish pronunciation: [ʂɨˈmanɨ kɔˈlɔɲɛ]) is a village in the administrative district of Gmina Grajewo, within Grajewo County, Podlaskie Voivodeship, in north-eastern Poland.
