= Kownatki, Podlaskie Voivodeship =

Kownatki
- Village
- Location within Poland
- Coordinates: 53°28′N 22°27′E
- Country: Poland
- Voivodeship: Podlaskie
- County: Grajewo
- Gmina: Radziłów
- Population: 146

Kownatki [kɔvˈnatki] is a village in the administrative district of Gmina Radziłów, within Grajewo County, Podlaskie Voivodeship, in north-eastern Poland.
