= Zakrzewo, Grajewo County =

Zakrzewo
- Village
- Location within Poland
- Coordinates: 53°27′N 22°21′E
- Country: Poland
- Voivodeship: Podlaskie
- County: Grajewo
- Gmina: Radziłów

Zakrzewo [zaˈkʂɛvɔ] is a village in the administrative district of Gmina Radziłów, within Grajewo County, Podlaskie Voivodeship, in north-eastern Poland.
