= Białaszewo-Kolonia =

Village in Gmina Grajewo, Poland

- Village
- Location within Poland
- Coordinates: 53°30′42″N 22°29′8″E
- Country: Poland
- Voivodeship: Podlaskie
- County: Grajewo
- Gmina: Grajewo

Białaszewo-Kolonia [bjawaˈʂɛvɔ kɔˈlɔɲa] is a village in the administrative district of Gmina Grajewo, within Grajewo County, Podlaskie Voivodeship, in north-eastern Poland.
