= Bzury, Podlaskie Voivodeship =

Bzury
- Village
- Location within Poland
- Coordinates: 53°35′N 22°21′E
- Country: Poland
- Voivodeship: Podlaskie
- County: Grajewo
- Gmina: Szczuczyn
- Population: 200

Bzury [ˈbzurɨ] is a village in the administrative district of Gmina Szczuczyn, within Grajewo County, Podlaskie Voivodeship, in north-eastern Poland.

== World War II ==
In 2012 the Polish Institute of National Remembrance launched an investigation into the 1941 murder of some twenty Jewish women from the Szczuczyn ghetto, committed locally, by six criminals who arrived in Bzury also from the village of Szczuczyn. The crime was investigated in 1950 by the authorities in Stalinist Poland, resulting in one death sentence, later commuted to life. The only convicted perpetrator, Stanisław Zalewski, died in 1957. Historian Barbara Engelking from IPN, who specializes in the history of Nazi era ghettos across Poland, studied the court documents and about a dozen witness testimonies dating back to 1948. The IPN investigation confirmed that the crime was premeditated. All victims were young, and came to Bzury on German orders to work on a farm. They were supposed to be brought back to the ghetto, but were allegedly killed for sexual gratification along the road the same evening.
