= Łojki =

Łojki can refer to:

- Łojki, Podlaskie Voivodeship
- Łojki, Silesian Voivodeship
