= Godlewo (disambiguation) =

Godlewo is a village in the administrative district of Gmina Grajewo, Poland

Godlewo may also refer to:

- Godlewo Wielkie, village in the administrative district of Gmina Nur, Poland
- Former Polish name of Garliava, Lithuania
