= Sulewo-Prusy =

- Village
- Location within Poland
- Coordinates: 53°30′N 22°24′E
- Country: Poland
- Voivodeship: Podlaskie
- County: Grajewo
- Gmina: Wąsosz

Sulewo-Prusy [suˈlɛvɔ ˈprusɨ] is a village in the administrative district of Gmina Wąsosz, within Grajewo County, Podlaskie Voivodeship, in north-eastern Poland.
