= Kędziorowo =

- Village
- Location within Poland
- Coordinates: 53°28′08″N 22°18′03″E
- Country: Poland
- Voivodeship: Podlaskie
- County: Grajewo
- Gmina: Wąsosz

Kędziorowo [kɛnd͡ʑɔˈrɔvɔ] is a village in the administrative district of Gmina Wąsosz, within Grajewo County, Podlaskie Voivodeship, in north-eastern Poland.
