= Obrytki, Grajewo County =

Obrytki
- Village
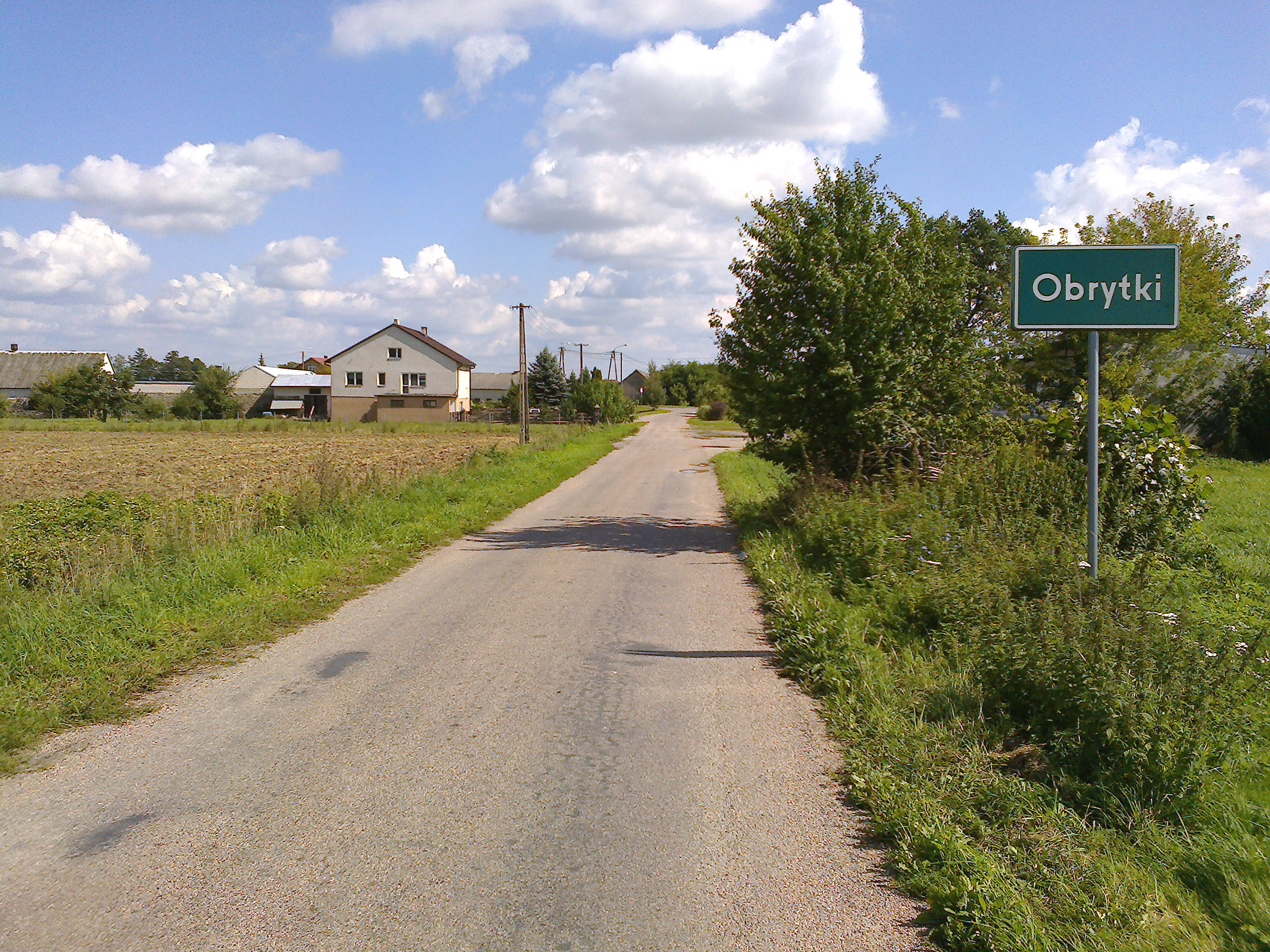

- Location within Poland
- Coordinates: 53°31′N 22°15′E
- Country: Poland
- Voivodeship: Podlaskie
- County: Grajewo
- Gmina: Szczuczyn

Obrytki [ɔˈbrɨtki] is a village in the administrative district of Gmina Szczuczyn, within Grajewo County, Podlaskie Voivodeship, in north-eastern Poland.
