= Zacieczki =

- Village
- Location within Poland
- Coordinates: 53°37′N 22°17′E
- Country: Poland
- Voivodeship: Podlaskie
- County: Grajewo
- Gmina: Szczuczyn

Zacieczki [zaˈt͡ɕɛt͡ʂki] is a village in the administrative district of Gmina Szczuczyn, within Grajewo County, Podlaskie Voivodeship, in north-eastern Poland.
