= Radziłów-Kolonia =

- Village
- Location within Poland
- Coordinates: 53°24′09″N 22°24′08″E
- Country: Poland
- Voivodeship: Podlaskie
- County: Grajewo
- Gmina: Radziłów

Radziłów-Kolonia [raˈd͡ʑiwuf kɔˈlɔɲa] is a village in the administrative district of Gmina Radziłów, within Grajewo County, Podlaskie Voivodeship, in north-eastern Poland.
