= Danowo, Gmina Szczuczyn =

Danowo
- Village
- Location within Poland
- Coordinates: 53°35′05″N 22°13′04″E
- Country: Poland
- Voivodeship: Podlaskie
- County: Grajewo
- Gmina: Szczuczyn

Danowo [daˈnɔvɔ] is a village in the administrative district of Gmina Szczuczyn, within Grajewo County, Podlaskie Voivodeship, in north-eastern Poland.
