= Czerwonki, Podlaskie Voivodeship =

Czerwonki
- Village
- Location within Poland
- Coordinates: 53°28′N 22°24′E
- Country: Poland
- Voivodeship: Podlaskie
- County: Grajewo
- Gmina: Radziłów

Czerwonki [t͡ʂɛrˈvɔnki] is a village in the administrative district of Gmina Radziłów, within Grajewo County, Podlaskie Voivodeship, in north-eastern Poland.
