= Karwowo, Gmina Radziłów =

Karwowo
- Village
- Location within Poland
- Coordinates: 53°24′33″N 22°26′07″E
- Country: Poland
- Voivodeship: Podlaskie
- County: Grajewo
- Gmina: Radziłów

Karwowo (Polish pronunciation: [karˈvɔvɔ]) is a village in the administrative district of Gmina Radziłów, within Grajewo County, Podlaskie Voivodeship, in north-eastern Poland.
