= Łosewo =

Łosewo may refer to the following places:

- Łosewo, Masovian Voivodeship (east-central Poland)
- Łosewo, Grajewo County in Podlaskie Voivodeship (north-east Poland)
- Łosewo, Kolno County in Podlaskie Voivodeship (north-east Poland)
