= Łoje-Awissa =

- Village
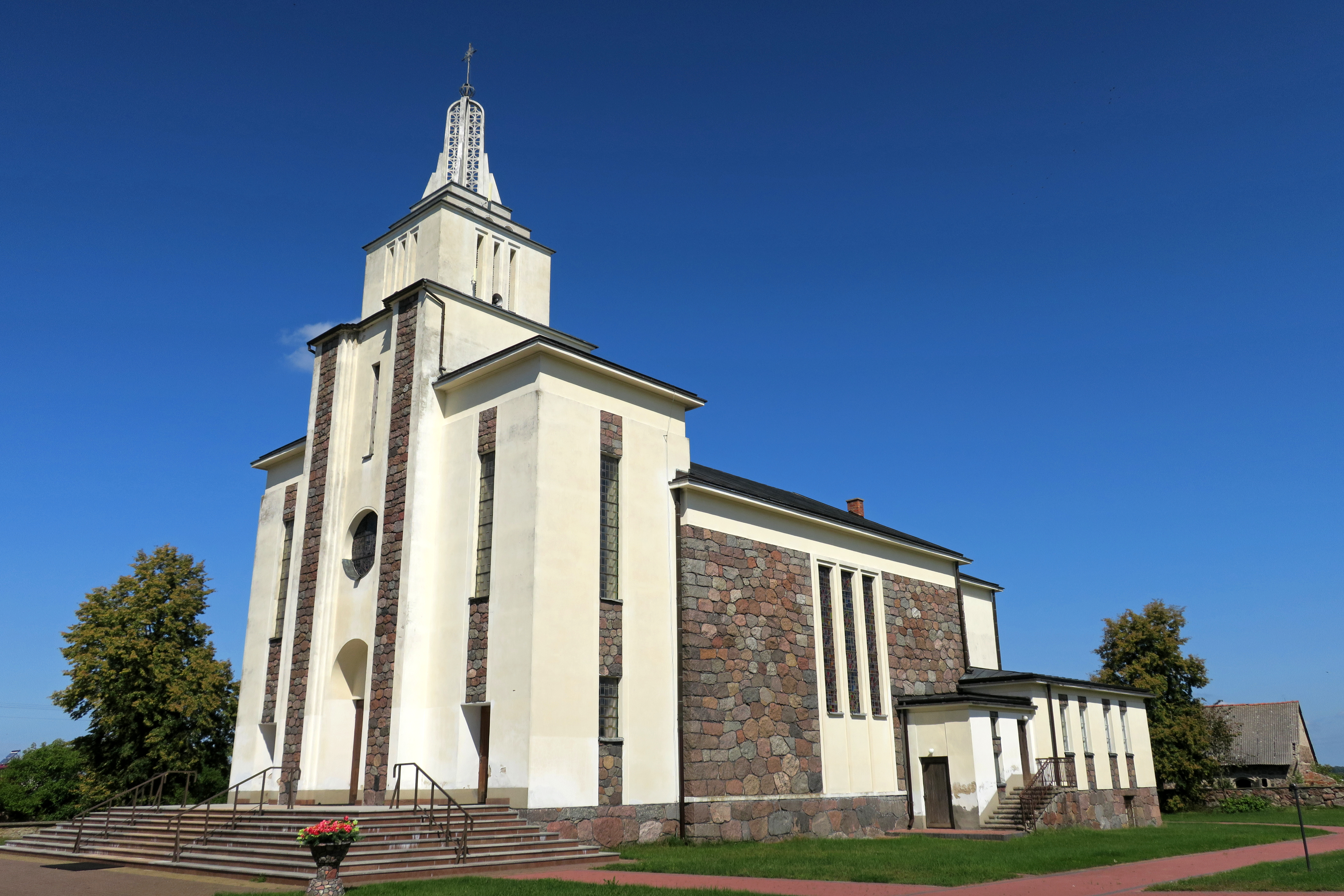

- Location within Poland
- Coordinates: 53°22′28″N 22°27′2″E
- Country: Poland
- Voivodeship: Podlaskie
- County: Grajewo
- Gmina: Radziłów
- Population: 173

Łoje-Awissa [ˈwɔjɛ aˈvissa] is a village in the administrative district of Gmina Radziłów, within Grajewo County, Podlaskie Voivodeship, in north-eastern Poland.
