= Kolonia-Gródź =

- Village
- Location within Poland
- Coordinates: 53°29′01″N 22°22′07″E
- Country: Poland
- Voivodeship: Podlaskie
- County: Grajewo
- Gmina: Wąsosz

Kolonia-Gródź [kɔˈlɔɲa ˈɡrut͡ɕ] is a village in the administrative district of Gmina Wąsosz, within Grajewo County, Podlaskie Voivodeship, in north-eastern Poland.
