= Janowo, Grajewo County =

Janowo
- Village
- Location within Poland
- Coordinates: 53°25′53″N 22°23′22″E
- Country: Poland
- Voivodeship: Podlaskie
- County: Grajewo
- Gmina: Radziłów

Janowo [jaˈnɔvɔ] is a village in the administrative district of Gmina Radziłów, within Grajewo County, Podlaskie Voivodeship, in north-eastern Poland.
