= Danówek =

- Village
- Location within Poland
- Coordinates: 53°40′07″N 22°22′08″E
- Country: Poland
- Voivodeship: (Podlaskie Voivodeship) Podlaskie
- County: Grajewo
- Gmina: Grajewo

Danówek [daˈnuvɛk] is a village in the administrative district of Gmina Grajewo, within Grajewo County, Podlaskie Voivodeship, in north-eastern Poland.
