= Zalesie, Grajewo County =

Zalesie
- Village
- Location within Poland
- Coordinates: 53°32′N 22°25′E
- Country: Poland
- Voivodeship: Podlaskie
- County: Grajewo
- Gmina: Wąsosz

Zalesie [zaˈlɛɕɛ] is a village in the administrative district of Gmina Wąsosz, within Grajewo County, Podlaskie Voivodeship, in north-eastern Poland.
