= Grąd =

Grąd may refer to:

- Grąd, Podlaskie Voivodeship
- Grąd, West Pomeranian Voivodeship
