= Boczki-Świdrowo =

- Village
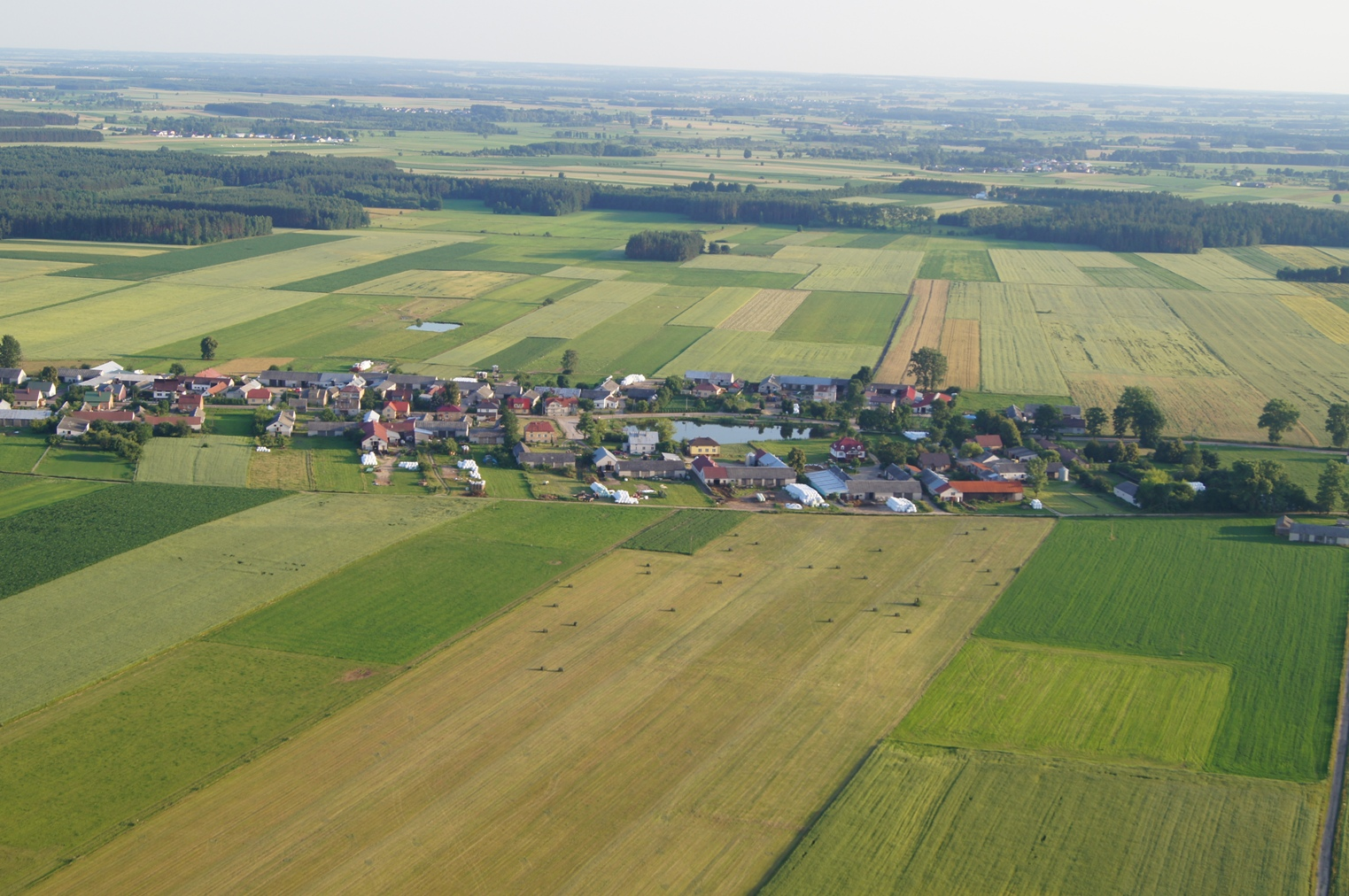

- Location within Poland
- Coordinates: 53°36′N 22°23′E
- Country: Poland
- Voivodeship: Podlaskie
- County: Grajewo
- Gmina: Grajewo
- Elevation: 150 m (490 ft)
- Population: 250

Boczki-Świdrowo [ˈbɔt͡ʂki ɕfiˈdrɔvɔ] is a village in the administrative district of Gmina Grajewo, within Grajewo County, Podlaskie Voivodeship, in north-eastern Poland.
