= Wólka, Grajewo County =

Wólka
- Village
- Location within Poland
- Coordinates: 53°32′41″N 22°18′17″E
- Country: Poland
- Voivodeship: Podlaskie
- County: Grajewo
- Gmina: Szczuczyn

Wólka [ˈvulka] is a village in the administrative district of Gmina Szczuczyn, within Grajewo County, Podlaskie Voivodeship, in north-eastern Poland.
