= Dębówka, Podlaskie Voivodeship =

Dębówka
- Village
- Location within Poland
- Coordinates: 53°28′01″N 22°24′01″E
- Country: Poland
- Voivodeship: Podlaskie
- County: Grajewo
- Gmina: Radziłów

Dębówka [dɛmˈbufka] is a village in the administrative district of Gmina Radziłów, within Grajewo County, Podlaskie Voivodeship, in north-eastern Poland.
