= Konopki-Awissa =

- Village
- Location within Poland
- Coordinates: 53°26′59″N 22°25′52″E
- Country: Poland
- Voivodeship: Podlaskie
- County: Grajewo
- Gmina: Radziłów

Konopki-Awissa [kɔˈnɔpki aˈvissa] is a village in the administrative district of Gmina Radziłów, within Grajewo County, Podlaskie Voivodeship, in north-eastern Poland.
