= Czaple, Podlaskie Voivodeship =

Czaple
- Village
- Location within Poland
- Coordinates: 53°26′39″N 22°18′57″E
- Country: Poland
- Voivodeship: Podlaskie
- County: Grajewo
- Gmina: Radziłów

Czaple [ˈt͡ʂaplɛ] is a village in the administrative district of Gmina Radziłów, within Grajewo County, Podlaskie Voivodeship, in north-eastern Poland.
