= Załuski, Podlaskie Voivodeship =

Załuski
- Village
- Location within Poland
- Coordinates: 53°34′N 22°13′E
- Country: Poland
- Voivodeship: Podlaskie
- County: Grajewo
- Gmina: Szczuczyn

Załuski [zaˈwuski] is a village in the administrative district of Gmina Szczuczyn, within Grajewo County, Podlaskie Voivodeship, in north-eastern Poland.
