= Gmina Wąsosz =

Gmina Wąsosz may refer to either of the following administrative districts in Poland:

- Gmina Wąsosz, Lower Silesian Voivodeship
- Gmina Wąsosz, Podlaskie Voivodeship
