= Uścianki, Grajewo County =

Uścianki
- Village
- Location within Poland
- Coordinates: 53°41′05″N 22°29′06″E
- Country: Poland
- Voivodeship: Podlaskie
- County: Grajewo
- Gmina: Grajewo

Uścianki [uɕˈt͡ɕaŋki] is a village in the administrative district of Gmina Grajewo, within Grajewo County, Podlaskie Voivodeship, in north-eastern Poland.
