= Klimaszewnica =

- Village
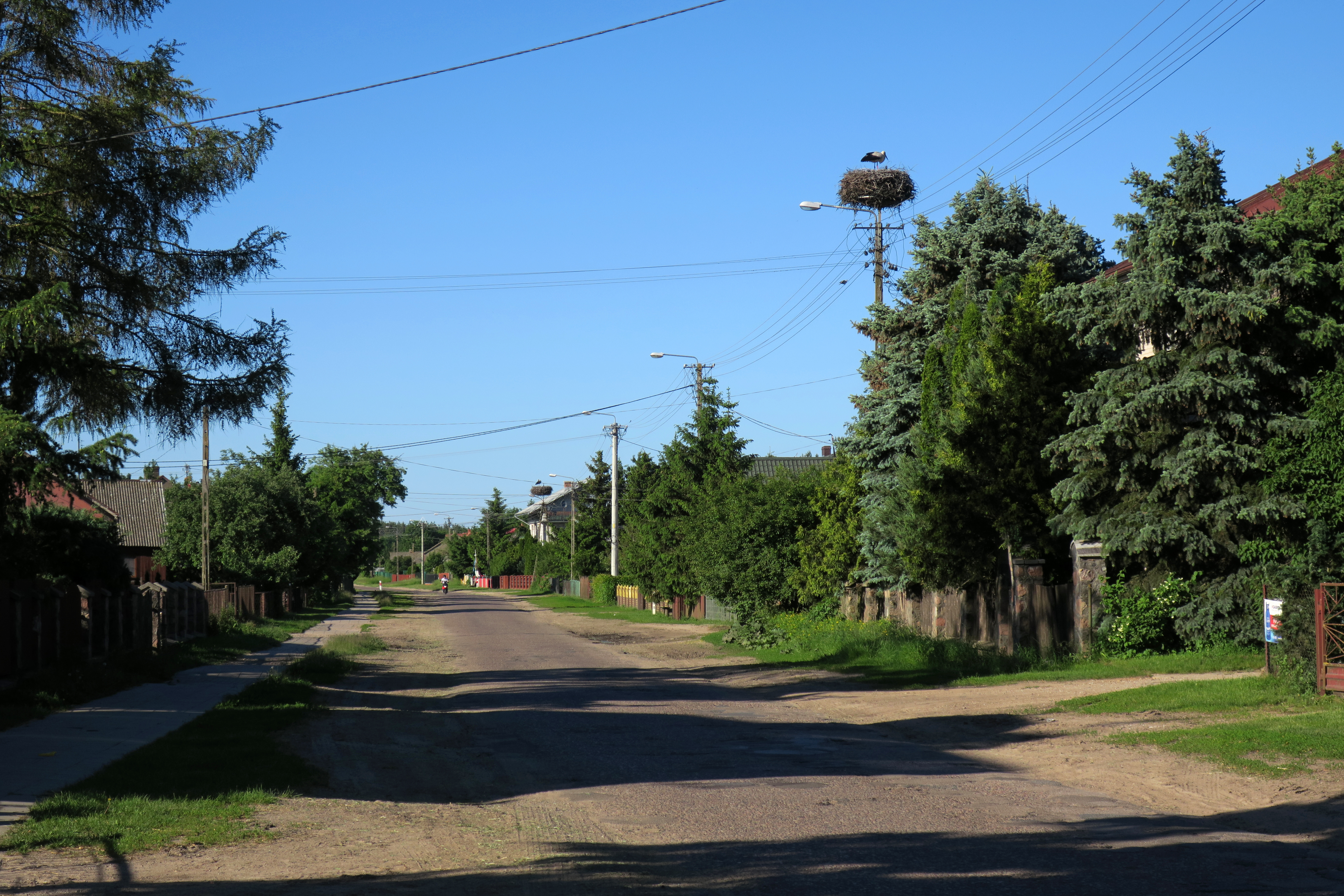

- Location within Poland
- Coordinates: 53°28′19″N 22°30′9″E
- Country: Poland
- Voivodeship: Podlaskie
- County: Grajewo
- Gmina: Radziłów
- Postal code: 19-213
- Vehicle registration: BGR

Klimaszewnica [klimaʂɛvˈnit͡sa] is a village in the administrative district of Gmina Radziłów, within Grajewo County, Podlaskie Voivodeship, in north-eastern Poland.

Four Polish citizens were murdered by Nazi Germany in the village during World War II.
