= Nowe Zacieczki =

- Village
- Location within Poland
- Coordinates: 53°37′3″N 22°16′43″E
- Country: Poland
- Voivodeship: Podlaskie
- County: Grajewo
- Gmina: Szczuczyn

Nowe Zacieczki [ˈnɔvɛ zaˈt͡ɕɛt͡ʂki] is a village in the administrative district of Gmina Szczuczyn, within Grajewo County, Podlaskie Voivodeship, in north-eastern Poland.
