= Brzeźno, Podlaskie Voivodeship =

Brzeźno
- Village
- Location within Poland
- Coordinates: 53°31′51″N 22°11′46″E
- Country: Poland
- Voivodeship: Podlaskie
- County: Grajewo
- Gmina: Szczuczyn

Brzeźno [ˈbʐɛʑnɔ] is a village in the administrative district of Gmina Szczuczyn, within Grajewo County, Podlaskie Voivodeship, in north-eastern Poland.
