= Borawskie-Awissa-Kolonia =

- Village
- Location within Poland
- Coordinates: 53°26′55″N 22°27′39″E
- Country: Poland
- Voivodeship: Podlaskie
- County: Grajewo
- Gmina: Radziłów

Borawskie-Awissa-Kolonia [bɔˈrafskʲɛ aˈvissa kɔˈlɔɲa] is a village in the administrative district of Gmina Radziłów, within Grajewo County, Podlaskie Voivodeship, in north-eastern Poland.
