= Kolonie Sojczyn Borowy =

- Settlement
- Location within Poland
- Coordinates: 53°34′25″N 22°34′18″E
- Country: Poland
- Voivodeship: Podlaskie
- County: Grajewo
- Gmina: Grajewo

Kolonie Sojczyn Borowy [kɔˈlɔɲɛ ˈsɔi̯t͡ʂɨn bɔˈrɔvɨ] is a settlement in the administrative district of Gmina Grajewo, within Grajewo County, Podlaskie Voivodeship, in north-eastern Poland.
