= Sluch =

Sluch may refer to the following rivers:

- Sluch (Belarus), a tributary of the Pripyat in Belarus
- Sluch (Ukraine), a tributary of the Horyn in Ukraine
- 251001 Sluch, a minor planet

== See also ==
- Słucz, a village in Poland
