= Brzozowa Wólka =

- Village
- Location within Poland
- Coordinates: 53°33′N 22°34′E
- Country: Poland
- Voivodeship: Podlaskie
- County: Grajewo
- Gmina: Grajewo

Brzozowa Wólka [bʐɔˈzɔva ˈvulka] is a village in the administrative district of Gmina Grajewo, within Grajewo County, Podlaskie Voivodeship, in north-eastern Poland.

== Location and Administrative Division ==
Brzozowa Wólka is part of the Podlaskie Voivodeship, which is one of the sixteen highest-level administrative subdivisions in Poland. The village is administratively governed by Gmina Grajewo, which is a type of Polish municipality or commune.

== Demographics ==
As of the 2021 National Census, Brzozowa Wólka has a population of 75 inhabitants. The demographic structure reveals a gender distribution with 41.3% female and 58.7% male residents. The village population has seen a decrease of roughly 34.8% between 1998 and 2021. The working-age population constitutes about 62.7% of the residents, with children (pre-working age) and elderly (post-working age) making up the rest. Household data from 2002 indicated the presence of 21 households with a predominance of larger families comprising five or more persons.

== Geography and Environment ==
Brzozowa Wólka is situated in a rural region characterized by the northern Polish landscapes typical of the Podlaskie area, including forests, fields, and small agricultural holdings. The regional climate and natural setting support traditional agricultural activities.
