= Grąd, Podlaskie Voivodeship =

Settlement in Gmina Radiłów, Poland

Grąd
- Settlement
- Location within Poland
- Coordinates: 53°28′08″N 22°24′09″E
- Country: Poland
- Voivodeship: Podlaskie
- County: Grajewo
- Gmina: Radziłów

Grąd [ɡrɔnt] is a settlement in the administrative district of Gmina Radziłów, within Grajewo County, Podlaskie Voivodeship, in north-eastern Poland.
