= Szymany, Gmina Grajewo =

Szymany
- Village
- Location within Poland
- Coordinates: 53°30′34″N 22°32′35″E
- Country: Poland
- Voivodeship: Podlaskie
- County: Grajewo
- Gmina: Grajewo
- Time zone: UTC+1 (CET)
  - Summer (DST): UTC+2 (CEST)

Szymany (Polish pronunciation: [ʂɨˈmanɨ]) is a village in the administrative district of Gmina Grajewo, within Grajewo County, Podlaskie Voivodeship, in north-eastern Poland.

== History ==
Three Polish citizens were murdered by Nazi Germany in the village during World War II.
