= Gmina Szczuczyn =

Gmina Szczuczyn Szczuczyn Commune
- Gmina
- Coat of arms

- Gmina Szczuczyn within the Grajewo County
- Coordinates (Szczuczyn): 53°33′58″N 22°17′6″E
- Country: Poland
- Voivodeship: Podlaskie
- County: Grajewo
- Seat: Szczuczyn

Area
  - Total: 115.72 km^{2} (44.68 sq mi)

Population (2011)
  - Total: 6,485
  - Density: 56.04/km^{2} (145.1/sq mi)
  - Urban: 3,523
  - Rural: 2,962
- Website: http://www.um.szczuczyn.pl

Gmina Szczuczyn is an urban-rural gmina (administrative district) in Grajewo County, Podlaskie Voivodeship, in north-eastern Poland. Its seat is the town of Szczuczyn, which lies approximately 15 kilometres (9 mi) south-west of Grajewo and 77 km (48 mi) north-west of the regional capital Białystok.

The gmina covers an area of 115.72 square kilometres (44.7 sq mi), and as of 2006 its total population is 6,675 (out of which the population of Szczuczyn amounts to 3,564, and the population of the rural part of the gmina is 3,111).

== Villages ==
Apart from the town of Szczuczyn, Gmina Szczuczyn contains the villages and settlements of Balcer, Bęćkowo, Brzeźno, Bzury, Chojnowo, Czarnówek, Czarnowo, Danowo, Dołęgi, Gutki, Jambrzyki, Koniecki Małe, Koniecki-Rostroszewo, Kurki, Lipnik, Mazewo, Miętusewo, Milewo, Niećkowo, Niedźwiadna, Niedźwiedzkie, Nowe Zacieczki, Obrytki, Przeszkoda, Rakowo, Skaje, Sokoły, Stare Guty, Świdry-Awissa, Tarachy, Wólka, Zacieczki, Załuski, and Zofiówka.

== Neighbouring gminas ==
Gmina Szczuczyn is bordered by the gminas of Biała Piska, Grabowo, Grajewo, Prostki, and Wąsosz.
