= Białogrądy =

- Village
- Location within Poland
- Coordinates: 53°30′N 22°36′E
- Country: Poland
- Voivodeship: Podlaskie
- County: Grajewo
- Gmina: Grajewo

Białogrądy [bjawɔˈɡrɔndɨ] is a village in the administrative district of Gmina Grajewo, within Grajewo County, Podlaskie Voivodeship, in north-eastern Poland.
