= Modzele, Gmina Wąsosz =

Modzele
- Village
- Location within Poland
- Coordinates: 53°32′06″N 22°17′02″E
- Country: Poland
- Voivodeship: Podlaskie
- County: Grajewo
- Gmina: Wąsosz

Modzele [mɔˈd͡zɛlɛ] is a village in the administrative district of Gmina Wąsosz, within Grajewo County, Podlaskie Voivodeship, in north-eastern Poland.
