= Stare Guty, Grajewo County =

Stare Guty
- Village
- Location within Poland
- Coordinates: 53°35′23″N 22°16′53″E
- Country: Poland
- Voivodeship: Podlaskie
- County: Grajewo
- Gmina: Szczuczyn

Stare Guty [ˈstarɛ ˈɡutɨ] is a village in the administrative district of Gmina Szczuczyn, within Grajewo County, Podlaskie Voivodeship, in north-eastern Poland.
