= Kurki, Gmina Szczuczyn =

Kurki
- Village
- Location within Poland
- Coordinates: 53°32′36″N 22°9′33″E
- Country: Poland
- Voivodeship: Podlaskie
- County: Grajewo
- Gmina: Szczuczyn

Kurki [ˈkurki] is a village in the administrative district of Gmina Szczuczyn, within Grajewo County, Podlaskie Voivodeship, in north-eastern Poland.
