= Lipnik, Gmina Grajewo =

Lipnik
- Village
- Location within Poland
- Coordinates: 53°35′19″N 22°28′39″E
- Country: Poland
- Voivodeship: Podlaskie
- County: Grajewo
- Gmina: Grajewo

Lipnik (Polish pronunciation: [ˈlipɲik]) is a village in the administrative district of Gmina Grajewo, within Grajewo County, Podlaskie Voivodeship, in north-eastern Poland.
