= Świdry-Awissa =

- Village
- Location within Poland
- Coordinates: 53°32′N 22°18′E
- Country: Poland
- Voivodeship: Podlaskie
- County: Grajewo
- Gmina: Szczuczyn
- Population: 180

Świdry-Awissa (Polish pronunciation: [ˈɕfidrɨ aˈvissa]) is a village in the administrative district of Gmina Szczuczyn, within Grajewo County, Podlaskie Voivodeship, in north-eastern Poland.
