= Lipnik, Gmina Szczuczyn =

Lipnik
- Village
- Location within Poland
- Coordinates: 53°32′56″N 22°09′13″E
- Country: Poland
- Voivodeship: Podlaskie
- County: Grajewo
- Gmina: Szczuczyn

Lipnik (Polish pronunciation: [ˈlipɲik]) is a village in the administrative district of Gmina Szczuczyn, within Grajewo County, Podlaskie Voivodeship, in north-eastern Poland.
