= Szymany, Gmina Wąsosz =

Szymany
- Village
- Location within Poland
- Coordinates: 53°30′35″N 22°24′47″E
- Country: Poland
- Voivodeship: Podlaskie
- County: Grajewo
- Gmina: Wąsosz

Szymany (Polish pronunciation: [ʂɨˈmanɨ]) is a village in the administrative district of Gmina Wąsosz, within Grajewo County, Podlaskie Voivodeship, in north-eastern Poland.
