= Słucz =

- Village
- Location within Poland
- Coordinates: 53°26′N 22°20′E
- Country: Poland
- Voivodeship: Podlaskie
- County: Grajewo
- Gmina: Radziłów
- Population: 580

Słucz [swut͡ʂ] is a village in the administrative district of Gmina Radziłów, within Grajewo County, Podlaskie Voivodeship, in north-eastern Poland.
