= Modzele, Gmina Grajewo =

Modzele
- Village
- Location within Poland
- Coordinates: 53°32′45″N 22°27′21″E
- Country: Poland
- Voivodeship: Podlaskie
- County: Grajewo
- Gmina: Grajewo
- Postal code: 19-200
- Vehicle registration: BGR

Modzele [mɔˈd͡zɛlɛ] is a village in the administrative district of Gmina Grajewo, within Grajewo County, Podlaskie Voivodeship, in north-eastern Poland.

Five Polish citizens were murdered by Nazi Germany in the village during World War II.
