= Ludwik Chałubiński =

Polish alpinist, chemist, and engineer

Ludwik Chałubiński (2 August 1860, in Warsaw – 17 April 1933, in Zakopane) was a Polish alpinist and chemical engineer.

Son of Tytus Chałubiński, Ludwik started climbing the Tatras at the age of 14, initially with his father and then with his friends. In 1877 together with guides Wojciech Roj and Maciej Sieczka, he made the first ascent of the Mięguszowiecki Szczyt Wielki. He was also the first to reach the summit of Młynarz (1885), the second to reach Baranie Rogi (1884), and the third on top of the Durny Szczyt (1881). He also climbed the Alps, where he was the first Pole to climb the Großglockner and Aletschhorn.

His daughter was Aniela Chałubińska was a Polish geographer, geologist and university professor.
