= Aniela Chałubińska =

Polish geologist, geographer (1902–1998)

Aniela Chałubińska (1 October 1902 – 6 July 1998) was a Polish geographer, geologist and university professor. She was one of the founders and the first director of the Institute of Regional Geography and remained there for 18 years at the Maria Curie Skłodowska University in Lublin, Poland.

== Biography ==
Chałubińska was born 1 October 1902 in Lviv (then part of Austria-Hungary) as the first child of chemical engineer and alpinist Ludwik Chałubiński and his wife Antonina Kamiński. She spent her childhood in Zakopane in a house built by her grandfather, the prominent doctor Tytus Chałubiński. From 1909 to 1921, she attended schools in Zakopane and Kraków, Poland, and went to the private women's grammar school of the Ursuline Sisters in Kraków. She graduated in geography from the Jan Kazimierz University in Lviv where her mentor was Eugeniusz Romer. In Lviv, she was influenced by Henryk Arctowski, Kazimierz Twardowski and Jan Czekanowski.

Her two papers from 1924 illuminate her academic activities as a student. One was a report on the activities of geographical student clubs in Poland, presented at a geographical congress in Prague, Czech Republic, and the other was a report on the Geographical Institute's trip to Kremenez, Ukraine. The report contained not only a description of the route and natural phenomena, but also a discussion of the origin of the observed forms of the Earth's surface. The two papers were published in 1928 and, on the basis of one of them, Chałubińska received her degree in geography and geology in 1926.

=== Teaching and teacher training ===
From 1926 to 1950, she taught geography at the Ursuline Sisters' Private Women's High School in Lublin, and in the same year she also taught at the State Women's High School until 1939 and the outbreak of World War II. In addition to working with young people, she also devoted herself to teacher training. From 1930, she was head of the first geography methodology center in Poland. Chałubińska's publications from this period deal with methodological issues, especially the role of travel in the education of young people. With Michał Janiszewski, she wrote two textbooks Geography of Europe and Geography of Poland.

During the War and the German occupation of Poland (1939–1945) Chałubińska continued her teaching activities, officially working at the commercial school, but like many of her colleagues, she gave secret lessons. The result of this collaboration was the organization of a small group of teachers who developed a project to reform secondary education in post-war Poland. Chałubińska continued to lead the work of the Methodology Center for Geography and provided individual support for teachers, especially beginners. With the conclusion of the World War, Chałubińska resumed her work at the grammar school and the Methodological Center for Geography.

In connection with the founding of the newly established Institute of Geography at the Maria Curie-Skłodowska University, Chałubińska was entrusted with lecturing on the methodology of geography in 1945. As early as 1946, an educational department was founded in the Lublin branch of the Polish Geological Society under Chałubińska's chairmanship, and the activities originally limited to Lublin were extended to the entire region and beyond.

=== University research ===
In 1950, Chałubińska was dismissed due to disloyalty from her position teaching at schools in the Lublin district for political reasons by the communist authorities who had taken control of Poland. Conveniently, this allowed her to devote more time to research in the field of geography. In 1955, Chałubińska was reinstated and appointed associate professor. In 1956, she took over the leadership of the Institute of Regional Geography, which had just been created. Chałubińska played an important role in the education of other geographers, as she was in charge of regional geography teaching, the constant supervision of geography didactics, the organization of geography trips and the management of seminars for seniors. She is said to have given as many as 92 lectures.

In 1968, the State Council awarded Chałubińska the academic title of professor based not only on her achievements in the field of methodology, but also on her scientific achievements in other areas of geography. She retired in 1973 and her last paper was published in 1990.

She died on 6 July 1998 in Lublin, Poland.

=== Study of thermal anomalies ===
Chałubińska proposed a new method of calculating thermal anomalies, which was not calculated from the average temperature as in the case of her predecessors, but from the theoretical temperature based on the angle of incidence of the sun's rays. Problems of physical geography were the subject of several of her other works. A new methodological idea was the relief index, which was proposed in 1963 in an article written jointly with E. Przesmycka. Chałubińska's publications included more than a dozen articles on fellow Polish geographers.

== Selected publications ==
- 1934: Geography of Europe
- 1936: Geography of Poland
- 1952: From the windows of the carriage on the Kraków–Zakopane route
- 1954: A trip around Zakopane
- 1956: Density of the water network in Poland
- 1957: Romer and the mountains
- 1969: Ignacy Domeyko and his contribution to the geography of Poland

== Selected awards ==
- 1956: Gold Cross of Merit
- 1973: Order of Poland Restored
- 1976: Medal of the People's Education Commission
- 1982: Honorary member of the Polish Geographical Society
- 1982: Gold Badge of the Geography Society
- 1991: Honorary member of the Lublin Scientific Society
- 1992: Honorary doctorate from the Maria Curie-Skłodowska University in Lublin
