= Wąsosz, Podlaskie Voivodeship =

Village in Poland

Wąsosz
- Village
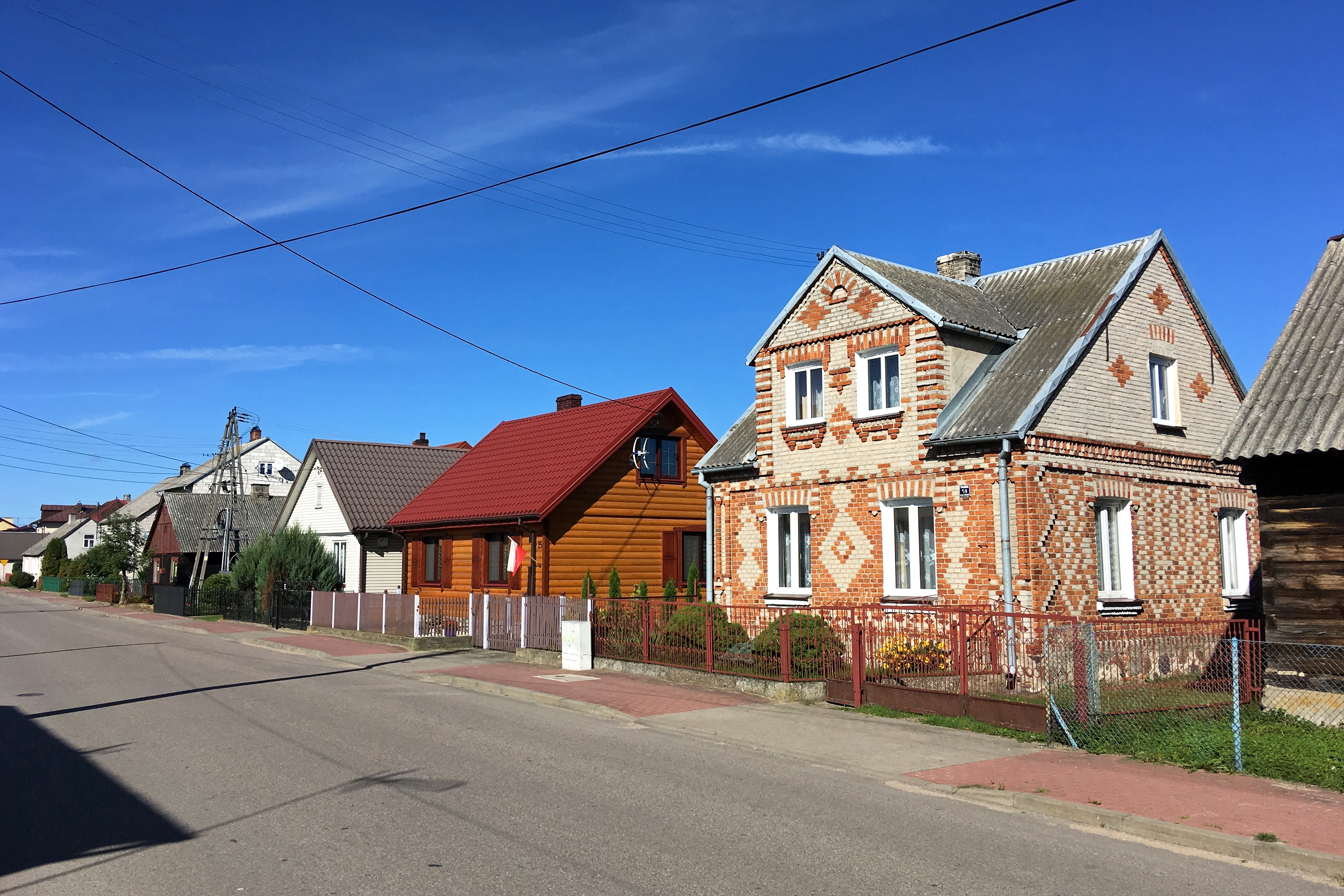

- Location within Poland
- Coordinates: 53°31′19″N 22°19′13″E
- Country: Poland
- Voivodeship: Podlaskie
- County: Grajewo
- Gmina: Wąsosz

Population
  - Total: 1,600
- Time zone: UTC+1 (CET)
  - Summer (DST): UTC+2 (CEST)
- Postal code: 19-222
- Vehicle registration: BGR

Wąsosz [ˈvɔ̃sɔʂ] is a village in Grajewo County, Podlaskie Voivodeship, in north-eastern Poland. It is the seat of the gmina (administrative district) called Gmina Wąsosz.

== Geography ==
It is situated on the Wissa River, a tributary of the Biebrza.

== History ==
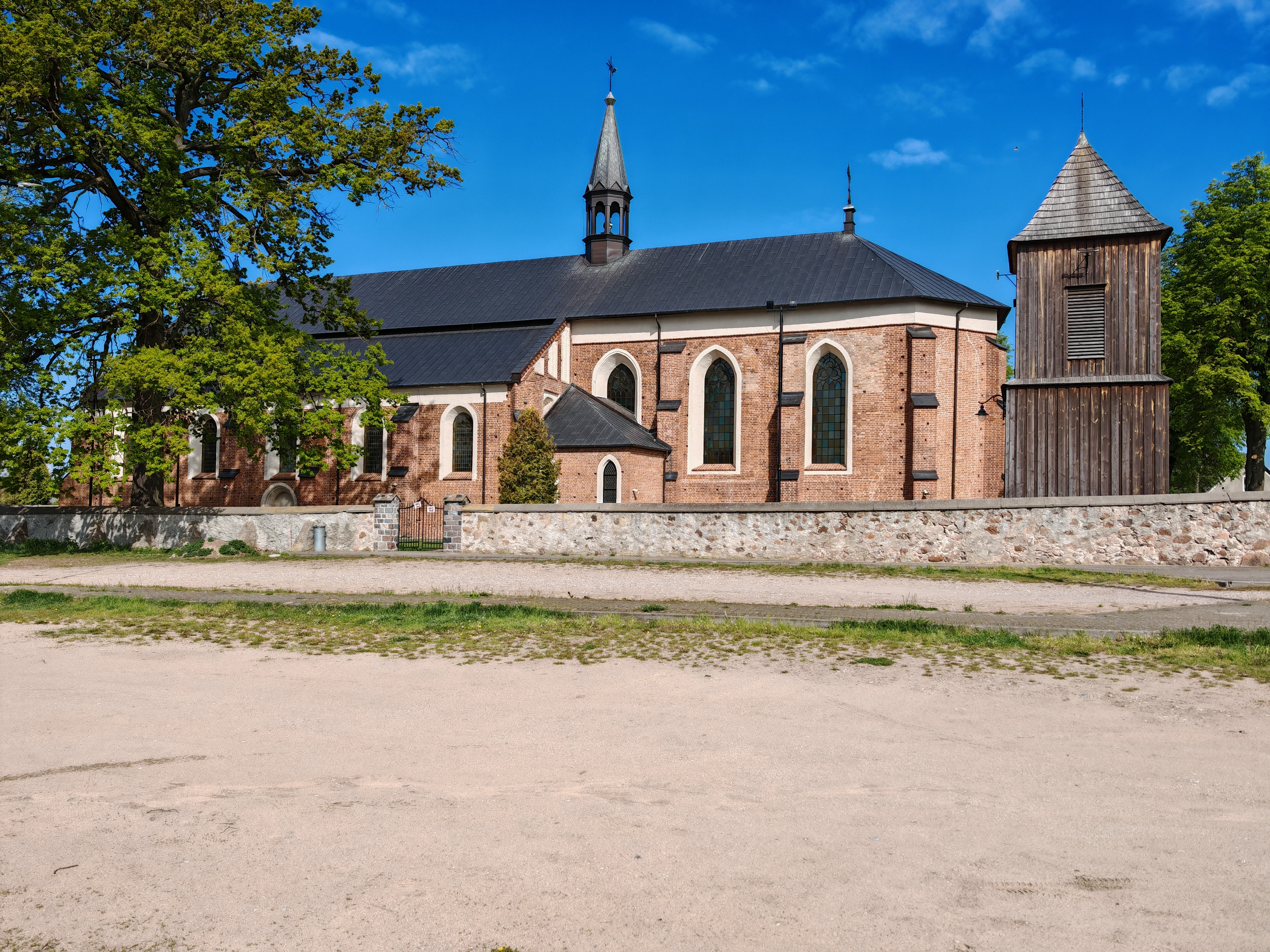
Gothic Transfiguration church

In 1435 Wąsosz was purchased by Duke Władysław I of Płock. It received Chełmno municipal rights from Duke Władysław I on 13 May 1436. It was a county seat and royal town of the Kingdom of Poland, administratively located in the Masovian Voivodeship in the Greater Poland Province. In 1605 local burgher Andrzej Rogala founded a Carmelite monastery. The already well-developed town was destroyed in the Swedish Deluge of 1655-1656 and then rebuilt. The town hall was erected in 1789. Almost all of the streets were paved at around the same time. The town lost its importance due to the development of the nearby town of Szczuczyn and the bypassing of Wąsosz by a new route connecting Warsaw and Kowno.

In the Third Partition of Poland in 1795, it was annexed by Prussia. In 1807, it was regained by Poles and included within the short-lived Polish Duchy of Warsaw, and after the dissolution of the duchy, it passed to the Russian Partition of Poland. The Carmelite monastery was closed in 1864 by the Tsarist authorities in reprisal for help offered by monks to victims of the January Uprising. They were sent to Katorga chained by the neck. Town rights were revoked by the Russian administration in 1870. After World War I, in 1918, Poland regained independence and control of Wąsosz.

Following the German-Soviet invasion of Poland, which started World War II in September 1939, it was first occupied by the Soviet Union until 1941, and then by Germany until 1944. Afterwards it was restored to Poland, although with a Soviet-installed communist regime, which remained in power until the Fall of Communism in the end of the 1980s. On the night between 4 and 5 July 1941, during the German invasion into Eastern Poland and the USSR, a small group of people murdered several dozens of the Jewish inhabitants of Wąsosz, in what is called the Wąsosz pogrom.

In the following years, the Polish anti-communist resistance was active in the town and area. In 1945, the resistance carried out four raids on the local communist police station, and, on 24 November 1945, captured the town, seizing control over the police station and local government offices.

== Sights ==
One of the most impressive points of interest in Wąsosz is its late Gothic church from 1508, with three altars adorned with religious paintings. It is at the Old Market Square. There is also a Baroque Church of the Nativity of the Virgin Mary from the early 17th century.
