= Łosewo, Grajewo County =

Łosewo
- Village
- Location within Poland
- Coordinates: 53°35′N 22°28′E
- Country: Poland
- Voivodeship: Podlaskie
- County: Grajewo
- Gmina: Grajewo

Łosewo [wɔˈsɛvɔ] is a village in the administrative district of Gmina Grajewo, within Grajewo County, Podlaskie Voivodeship, in north-eastern Poland.
