= Łojki, Podlaskie Voivodeship =

Łojki
- Village
- Location within Poland
- Coordinates: 53°33′N 22°30′E
- Country: Poland
- Voivodeship: Podlaskie
- County: Grajewo
- Gmina: Grajewo
- Population (approx.): 80

Łojki [ˈwɔi̯ki] is a village in the administrative district of Gmina Grajewo, within Grajewo County, Podlaskie Voivodeship, in north-eastern Poland.
