= Gmina Grajewo =

Gmina Grajewo Grajewo Commune
- Gmina
- Coat of arms

- Gmina Grajewo within the Grajewo County
- Coordinates (Grajewo): 53°39′N 22°27′E
- Country: Poland
- Voivodeship: Podlaskie
- County: Grajewo
- Seat: Grajewo

Area
  - Total: 308.13 km^{2} (118.97 sq mi)

Population (2011)
  - Total: 6,041
  - Density: 19.61/km^{2} (50.78/sq mi)
- Website: http://www.gminagrajewo.pl

Gmina Grajewo is a rural gmina (administrative district) in Grajewo County, Podlaskie Voivodeship, in north-eastern Poland. Its seat is the town of Grajewo, although the town is not part of the territory of the gmina.

The gmina covers an area of 308.13 square kilometres (119.0 sq mi), and as of 2006 its total population is 6,142 (6,041 in 2011).

== Villages ==
Gmina Grajewo contains the villages and settlements of Białaszewo, Białaszewo-Kolonia, Białogrądy, Białogrądy-Kolonia, Boczki-Świdrowo, Brzozowa, Brzozowa Wólka, Chojnówek, Ciemnoszyje, Cyprki, Danówek, Dybła, Elżbiecin, Flesze, Gackie, Godlewo, Grozimy, Kacprowo, Kapice, Kolonie Sojczyn Borowy, Konopki, Konopki-Kolonie, Koszarówka, Koty-Rybno, Kurejewka, Kurejwa, Kurki, Łamane Grądy, Łękowo, Lipińskie, Lipnik, Łojki, Łosewo, Mareckie, Mierucie, Modzele, Okół, Pieniążki, Podlasek, Popowo, Ruda, Sienickie, Sikora, Sojczyn Borowy, Sojczyn Grądowy, Sojczynek, Szymany, Szymany-Kolonie, Toczyłowo, Uścianki, Wierzbowo, Wojewodzin and Zaborowo.

== Neighbouring gminas ==
Gmina Grajewo is bordered by the gminas of Goniądz, Prostki, Radziłów, Rajgród, Szczuczyn and Wąsosz.
