= Konopki, Gmina Radziłów =

Konopki
- Village
- Location within Poland
- Coordinates: 53°26′58″N 22°25′51″E
- Country: Poland
- Voivodeship: Podlaskie
- County: Grajewo
- Gmina: Radziłów

Konopki [kɔˈnɔpki] is a village in the administrative district of Gmina Radziłów, within Grajewo County, Podlaskie Voivodeship, in north-eastern Poland.
