= Lipnik, Kursk Oblast =

Rural locality in Kursk Oblast, Russia

Lipnik Липник
- Village
- Interactive map of Lipnik
- Location of Lipnik Lipnik (Kursk Oblast)
- Coordinates: 51°25′56″N 35°45′45″E
- Country: Russia
- Federal subject: Kursk Oblast
- Administrative district: Medvensky District
- SelsovietSelsoviet: Gostomlyansky
- Elevation: 162 m (531 ft)

Population (2010 Census)
  - Total: 24
  - Estimate (2010): 24 (0%)

Municipal status
  - Municipal district: Medvensky Municipal District
  - Rural settlement: Gostomlyansky Selsoviet Rural Settlement
- Time zone: UTC+3 (MSK)
- Postal code: 307042
- Dialing code: +7 47146
- OKTMO ID: 38624420171
- Website: gostomlja.ru

Lipnik (Russian: Липник) is a rural locality (Russian: деревня, lit. 'village') in Gostomlyansky Selsoviet Rural Settlement, Medvensky District, Kursk Oblast, Russia. Population: 24 (2010 census); 43 (2002 census);

== Geography ==
The village is located on the Nemcha River (a left tributary of the Reut River in the Seym basin), 49 km (30 mi) from the Russia–Ukraine border, 41 km (25 mi) south-west of Kursk, 23 km (14 mi) west of the district center – the urban-type settlement Medvenka, 6 km (3.7 mi) from the selsoviet center – 1st Gostomlya.

Climate

Lipnik has a warm-summer humid continental climate (Dfb in the Köppen climate classification).

== Transport ==
Lipnik is located 22 km (14 mi) from the federal route M-2 Crimea Highway (a part of the European route E105), 5 km (3.1 mi) from the road of regional importance 38K-004 (Dyakonovo – Sudzha – border with Ukraine), 18.5 km (11.5 mi) from the road of intermunicipal significance 38H-185 (M2 "Crimea Highway" – Gakhovo), 2 km (1.2 mi) from the road 38H-195 (38N-185 – 38K-004), 23.5 km (14.6 mi) from the nearest railway halt 439 km (railway line Lgov I — Kursk).

The rural locality is situated 51 km (32 mi) from Kursk Vostochny Airport, 103 km (64 mi) from Belgorod International Airport and 243 km (151 mi) from Voronezh Peter the Great Airport.
