= Gmina Radziłów =

Gmina Radziłów Radziłów Commune
- Gmina
- Coat of arms

- Gmina Radziłów within the Grajewo County
- Coordinates (Radziłów): 53°24′39″N 22°24′36″E
- Country: Poland
- Voivodeship: Podlaskie
- County: Grajewo
- Seat: Radziłów

Area
  - Total: 199.38 km^{2} (76.98 sq mi)

Population (2011)
  - Total: 5,024
  - Density: 25.20/km^{2} (65.26/sq mi)

Gmina Radziłów is a rural gmina (administrative district) in Grajewo County, Podlaskie Voivodeship, in north-eastern Poland. Its seat is the village of Radziłów, which lies approximately 27 kilometres (17 mi) south of Grajewo and 61 km (38 mi) north-west of the regional capital Białystok.

The administrative district (Polish: gmina) covers an area of 199.38 square kilometres (77.0 sq mi), and as of 2006 its total population is 5,114 (5,024 in 2011).

== Villages ==
Gmina Radziłów contains the villages and settlements of Barwiki, Borawskie-Awissa, Borawskie-Awissa-Kolonia, Brodowo, Brychy, Czachy, Czaple, Czerwonki, Dębówka, Dusze, Glinki, Grąd, Janowo, Karwowo, Kieljany, Klimaszewnica, Konopki, Konopki-Awissa, Kownatki, Kramarzewo, Łoje-Awissa, Łoje-Gręzko, Mikuty, Mścichy, Okrasin, Ostrowik, Racibory, Radziłów, Radziłów-Kolonia, Rydzewo Szlacheckie, Rydzewo-Pieniążek, Słucz, Słucz-Kolonie, Sośnia, Święcienin, Święcienin-Kolonia, Szlasy, Szyjki, Wiązownica, Wypychy, Zakrzewo and Zawisie.

== Neighbouring gminas ==
Gmina Radziłów is bordered by the districts of Goniądz, Grajewo, Jedwabne, Przytuły, Trzcianne and Wąsosz.
