= Kurki (surname) =

Kurki is a Finnish surname. Notable people with the surname include:

- Matti Kurki, legendary Finnish chieftain
- Mikael Kurki (born 1987), Finnish ice hockey player
- Ville Kurki (born 1968), Finnish sailor
