= Gmina Wąsosz, Podlaskie Voivodeship =

Gmina Wąsosz Wąsosz Commune
- Gmina
- Coat of arms

- Gmina Wąsosz within the Grajewo County
- Coordinates (Wąsosz): 53°31′19″N 22°19′13″E
- Country: Poland
- Voivodeship: Podlaskie
- County: Grajewo
- Seat: Wąsosz

Area
  - Total: 117.92 km^{2} (45.53 sq mi)

Population (2011)
  - Total: 3,954
  - Density: 33.53/km^{2} (86.85/sq mi)

Gmina Wąsosz is a rural gmina (administrative district) in Grajewo County, Podlaskie Voivodeship, in north-eastern Poland. Its seat is the village of Wąsosz, which lies approximately 17 kilometres (11 mi) south-west of Grajewo and 73 km (45 mi) north-west of the regional capital Białystok.

The gmina covers an area of 117.92 square kilometres (45.5 sq mi), and as of 2006 its total population is 3,999 (3,954 in 2011).

== Villages ==
Gmina Wąsosz contains the villages and settlements of Bagienice, Bukowo Duże, Jaki, Kędziorowo, Kolonia-Gródź, Kolonia-Łazy, Kolonie-Ławsk, Komosewo, Kudłaczewo, Ławsk, Łempice, Modzele, Niebrzydy, Nieciki, Sulewo-Kownaty, Sulewo-Prusy, Szymany, Wąsosz, Zalesie and Żebry.

== Neighbouring gminas ==
Gmina Wąsosz is bordered by the gminas of Grabowo, Grajewo, Przytuły, Radziłów and Szczuczyn.
