= Lipnik, Cherepovetsky District, Vologda Oblast =

Lipnik Липник
- Village
- Location within Vologda Oblast Location within Russia
- Coordinates: 59°28′N 37°54′E
- Country: Russia
- Region: Vologda Oblast
- District: Cherepovetsky District
- Time zone: UTC+3:00

Lipnik (Russian: Липник) is a rural locality (a village) in Voskresenskoye Rural Settlement, Cherepovetsky District, Vologda Oblast, Russia. The population was 1 as of 2002.

== Geography ==
Lipnik is located 53 km (33 mi) north of Cherepovets (the district's administrative centre) by road. Popovskoye is the nearest rural locality.
