= Wizna Land =

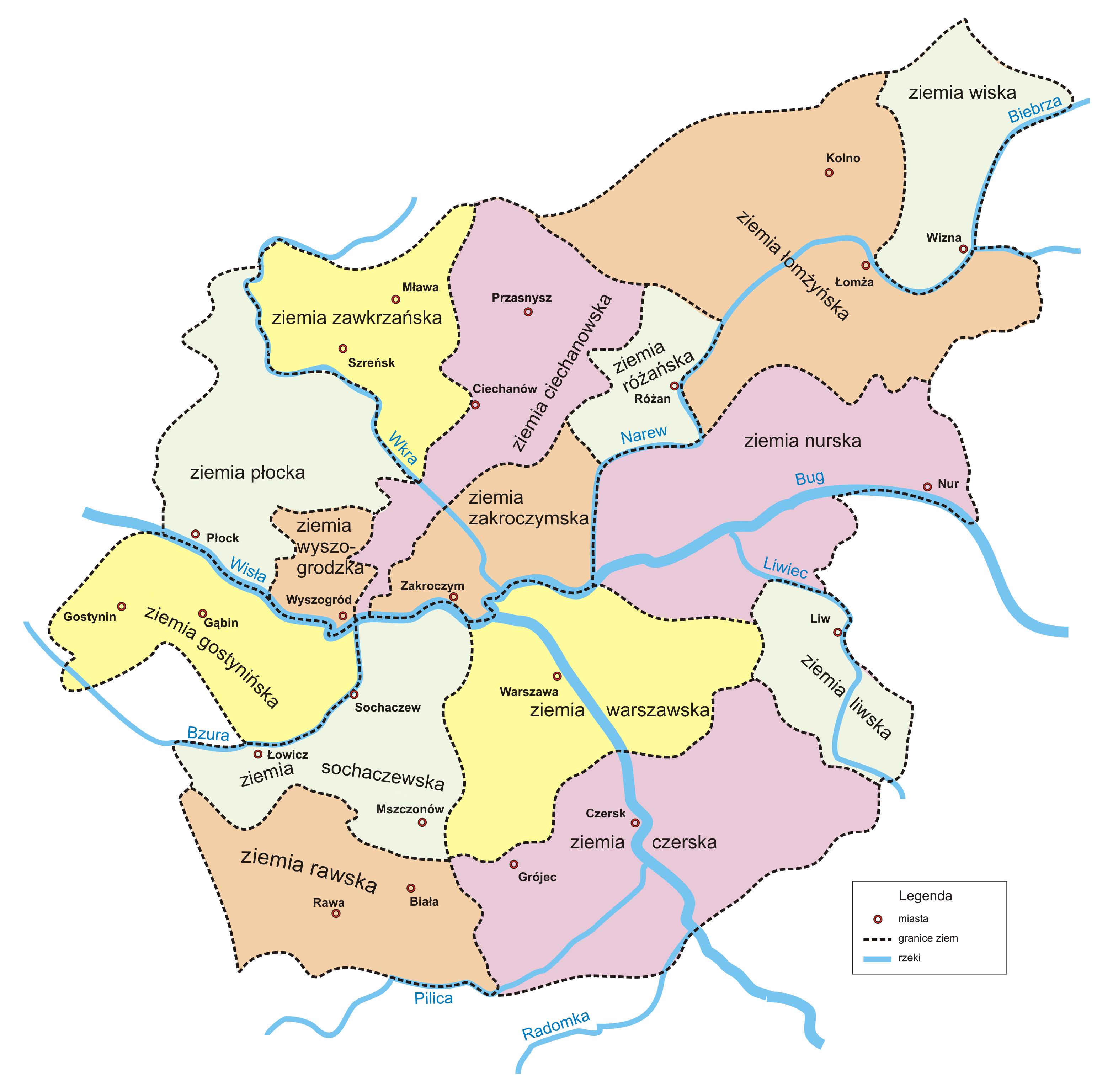
historical lands of Masovia

Wizna Land (Polish: ziemia wiska), named after the town of Wizna, was an administrative unit (ziemia) of the Duchy of Mazovia, Kingdom of Poland and the Polish–Lithuanian Commonwealth. With its capital in Wizna, it belonged to Masovian Voivodeship. In the 16th century, Wizna Land was divided into two counties: Wizna (area 555 km^{2}) and Wasosz (area 863 km^{2}). The total area of Wizna Land was 1419 km^{2}, with 280 villages.

Wizna Land was located in the extreme northeastern corner of the Duchy of Mazovia. Until the Union of Krewo, it was frequently raided by the Lithuanians and the Yotvingians. The starosta resided in Wizna, and the province existed until the Partitions of Poland.

== Sources ==
- Adolf Pawiński: Polska XVI wieku pod względem geograficzno-statystycznym. T. 5: Mazowsze. Warszawa: Księgarnia Gebethnera i Wolffa, 1895
