= Grajewo County =

Grajewo County Powiat grajewski
- County
- Flag Coat of arms

- Location within the voivodeship
- Coordinates (Grajewo): 53°39′N 22°27′E
- Country: Poland
- Voivodeship: Podlaskie
- Seat: Grajewo
- Gminas: Total 6 (incl. 1 urban): Grajewo; Gmina Grajewo; Gmina Radziłów; Gmina Rajgród; Gmina Szczuczyn; Gmina Wąsosz

Area
  - Total: 967.24 km^{2} (373.45 sq mi)

Population (2019)
  - Total: 47,353
  - Density: 48.957/km^{2} (126.80/sq mi)
  - Urban: 26,858
  - Rural: 20,495
- Car plates: BGR
- Website: sp-grajewo.pbip.pl at the Wayback Machine (archived 2003-10-31)

Grajewo County (Polish: powiat grajewski) is a unit of territorial administration and local government (powiat) in Podlaskie Voivodeship, north-eastern Poland. It came into being on January 1, 1999, as a result of the Polish local government reforms passed in 1998. Its administrative seat and largest town is Grajewo, which lies 76 kilometres (47 mi) north-west of the regional capital Białystok. The county also contains the towns of Szczuczyn, lying 15 km (9 mi) south-west of Grajewo, and Rajgród, 19 km (12 mi) north-east of Grajewo.

The county covers an area of 967.24 square kilometres (373.5 sq mi). As of 2019 its total population is 47,353, out of which the population of Grajewo is 21,909, that of Szczuczyn is 3,376, that of Rajgród is 1,573, and the rural population is 20,495.

== Neighbouring counties ==
Grajewo County is bordered by Ełk County to the north, Augustów County to the east, Mońki County to the south-east, Łomża County to the south, Kolno County to the south-west and Pisz County to the west.

== Administrative divisions ==
The county is subdivided into six gminas (one urban, two urban-rural and three rural). These are listed in the following table, in descending order of population.

Gmina	Type	Area (km^{2})	Population (2019)	Seat
Grajewo	urban	18.9	21,909	
Gmina Szczuczyn	urban-rural	115.7	6,030	Szczuczyn
Gmina Grajewo	rural	308.1	5,801	Grajewo *
Gmina Rajgród	urban-rural	207.2	5,230	Rajgród
Gmina Radziłów	rural	199.4	4,768	Radziłów
Gmina Wąsosz	rural	117.9	3,615	Wąsosz
* seat not part of the gmina
