= Eldridge Street Synagogue =

Orthodox synagogue in Manhattan, New York

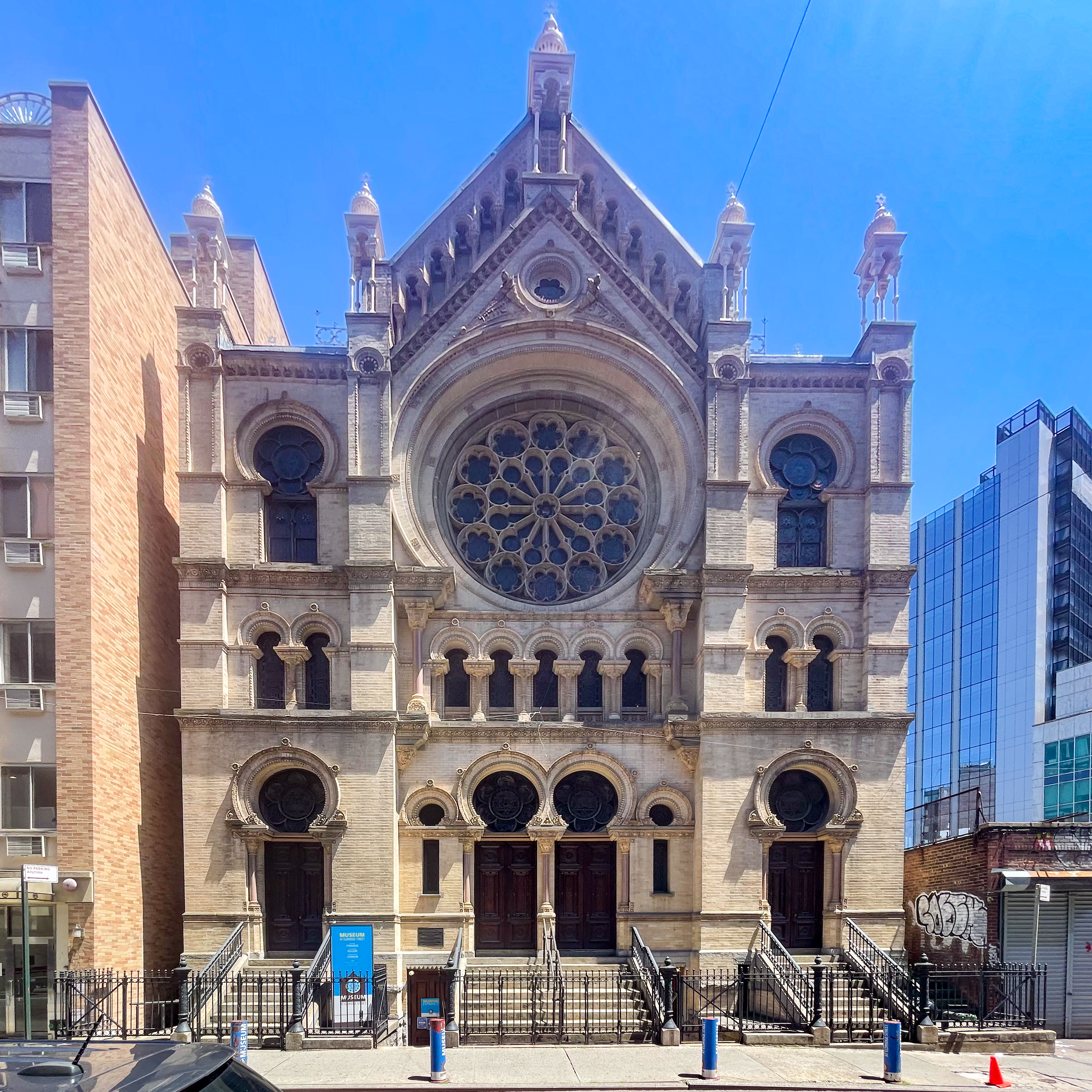
- West facade in 2022

- Location in Lower Manhattan Location in New York City Location in New York

Religion
- Affiliation: Orthodox Judaism
- Ecclesiastical or organisational status: Synagogue
- Ownership: Kahal Adath Jeshurun with Anshe Lubz
- Status: Active

Location
- Location: 12 Eldridge Street
- Municipality: Manhattan, New York City
- State: New York
- Country: United States
- Coordinates: 40°42′53″N 73°59′37″W

Architecture
- Architects: Peter Herter; Francis William Herter
- Type: Moorish Revival
- Established: 1852 (congregation)
- Groundbreaking: September 1886
- Completed: September 4, 1887
- Construction cost: $91,907.61 (equivalent to $3,293,000 in 2025)

Specifications
- Direction of façade: West (main facade)
- Length: 79 ft (24 m)
- Width: 53 ft (16 m)
- Site area: 60 by 87.5 ft (18.3 by 26.7 m)
- Materials: Brick, terracotta
- Eldridge Street Synagogue
- U.S. National Register of Historic Places
- U.S. National Historic Landmark
- New York State Register of Historic Places
- New York City Landmark
- NRHP reference No.: 80002687
- NYSRHP No.: 06101.000615
- NYCL No.: 1107

Significant dates
- Added to NRHP: March 28, 1980
- Designated NHL: June 19, 1996
- Designated NYSRHP: June 23, 1980
- Designated NYCL: July 8, 1980

The Eldridge Street Synagogue is an Orthodox Jewish synagogue at 12–16 Eldridge Street in the Chinatown and Lower East Side neighborhoods of Manhattan in New York City. Built in 1887 for Congregation Kahal Adath Jeshurun, the synagogue is one of the first erected in the U.S. by Eastern European Jews. The congregation, officially known as Kahal Adath Jeshurun with Anshe Lubz, still owns the synagogue and hosts weekly services there in the 21st century. The Museum at Eldridge Street, founded in 1986 as the Eldridge Street Project, also occupies the synagogue under a long-term lease. The building is a National Historic Landmark and a New York City designated landmark.

The congregation was established in 1852 as Beth Hamedrash and had congregants from across Eastern Europe. It relocated several times and was renamed Kahal Adath Jeshurun after merging with Holkhe Yosher Vizaner in 1886. Kahal Adath Jeshurun acquired a site for a new synagogue on Eldridge Street in 1886, and the building was dedicated on September 4, 1887. The congregation's membership peaked between 1890 and 1915, with up to 800 members, and the congregation merged with Anshe Lubz in 1909. Membership dwindled significantly after the 1920s, as congregants relocated and the Immigration Act of 1924 restricted new immigration. The main sanctuary was closed completely in 1954, and the remaining congregants met in the basement. Preservationists began trying to save the building in the 1970s and stabilized it in the early 1980s. The Eldridge Street Project raised money for a reconstruction of the synagogue, which was completed in 2007.

The synagogue was designed by Peter and Francis William Herter in the Moorish Revival style, with Gothic Revival and Romanesque Revival elements spread throughout the building. The Eldridge Street facade includes a rose window, two stair towers, and arched openings. There is another rose window in the rear and finials on the rooftops. The main and largest space is the sanctuary, which includes two levels of seating, a Torah ark, and a central bimah. The lower level was originally a study hall, which has been converted to galleries. The modern-day museum is focused on history and culture, and a small number of worshippers of continue to hold services there. Over the years, the synagogue has received architectural commentary and has influenced the designs of other local synagogues.

== Early history ==
Many immigrants who came to New York City in the late 19th and early 20th centuries settled on the Lower East Side of Manhattan. This influx included hundreds of thousands of Yiddish-speaking Eastern European Jews. The Eldridge Street Synagogue is one of the first synagogues erected in the United States by Eastern European Jews. Prior to its construction, many Jews in the neighborhood rented other spaces and used them as makeshift synagogues. Even the neighborhood's largest Jewish congregations were housed in converted Christian churches.

The Eldridge Street Synagogue was built for Congregation Kahal Adath Jeshurun, an Orthodox Jewish congregation. (Note: Alternate spellings exist for all three parts of the congregation's name. These include Khal Adath Jeshurun, K'hal Adas Jeshurun, Kehal Adath Yeshurun. and Kaal Adar Jeshurun. According to the National Park Service, the spelling Kahal Adath Jeshurun is the easiest for English speakers to pronounce.) The name literally means "Community of the People of Israel" in Hebrew, but it is often officially translated in English as "People's Congregation of the Just". The use of the name Adath Jeshurun was meant to signify that the congregation signified "true Israel".

=== Foundation of congregation ===
Kahal Adath Jeshurun was established in 1852 as Beth Hamedrash ("House of Study" in Hebrew), and consisted of Jews from various parts of Eastern Europe. The founding rabbi, Abraham Joseph Ash, was the first Orthodox rabbi from Eastern Europe to serve in the United States. After moving around several times, the congregation purchased a Welsh chapel on Allen Street in 1856. Following a petty dispute over the Allen Street synagogue, 23 members of Beth Hamedrash split in 1859 to form Beth Hamedrash Hagodol, adding the word "Hagodol" ("The Great") to the original name.

The remaining 46 members remained on Allen Street for over two decades. In contrast to Beth Hamedrash Hagrodol, which was loyal to its rabbi, the congregation of the original Beth Hamedrash mainly was led by its lay president. Beth Hamedrash's first president was the banker Sender Jarmulowsky, who was appointed in 1872 and served for two years. The Manhattan Railway Company's Second Avenue Elevated opened above Allen Street in the late 1870s, causing pollution and casting shadows. The congregation successfully sued for damages, although it would not receive any compensation until 1899. By the 1880s, many other Jewish congregations had much larger buildings, while Beth Hamedrash was still using its converted chapel at 78 Allen Street.

Documents indicate that Congregation Machsike Torah Sinier paid $19,000 for Beth Hamedrash's Allen Street building in May 1886. (Note: About $601,000 in 2025 (Note: Johnston, Louis; Williamson, Samuel H. (2023). "What Was the U.S. GDP Then?". MeasuringWorth. United States Gross Domestic Product deflator figures follow the MeasuringWorth series.)) The congregation also merged with Holkhe Yosher Vizaner (Note: Also spelled Holche Josher Wizaner) (whose name is Hebrew for "Those Who Walk in Righteousness") by 1886. Holkhe Yosher Vizaner had largely been composed of people from Wiżajny (Vizan), while the merged congregation included Jews from a wider geographic area. The merged congregation began calling itself Kahal Adath Jeshurun, in part to cater to the congregants' more diverse geographic backgrounds. Kahal Adath Jeshurun was opposed to the principles espoused by Reform Judaism. It wanted to build a grand synagogue to differentiate itself from large Reform synagogues such as Temple Emanu-El and Central Synagogue. The planned synagogue would also draw attention to the congregation from within New York City's Orthodox community. At the time, thousands of Jewish emigrants from Eastern Europe came to the city annually, and the congregation had concerns that they would be lured away by Reform synagogues or secular organizations. The Jewish-history scholar Jeffrey S. Gurock wrote that Kahal Adath Jeshurun was the best example of "the proto-Americanized synagogue", establishing standards for Orthodox congregations in the city.

=== New synagogue building ===
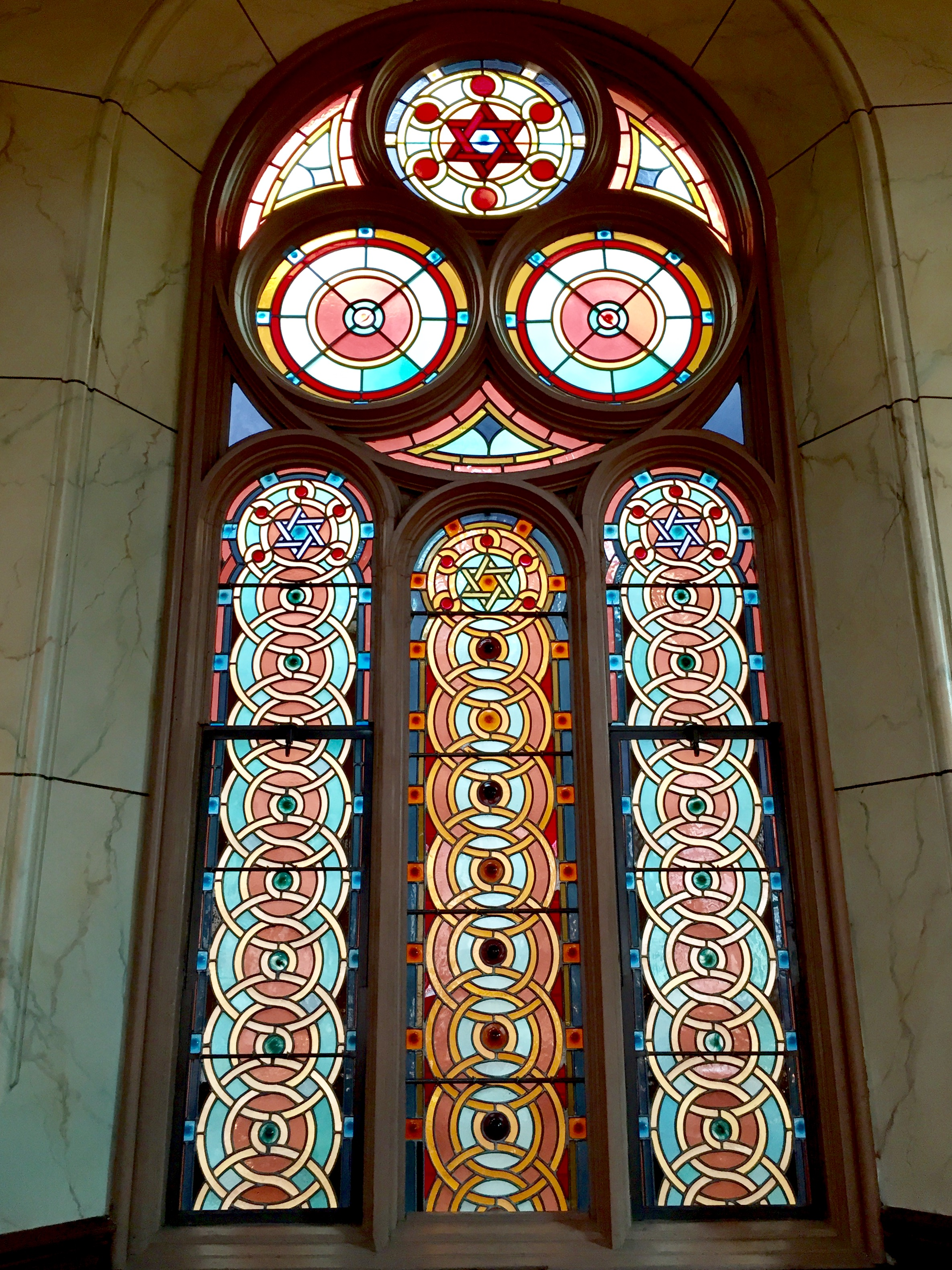
Stained glass with arch

==== Development ====
The congregants acquired three land lots at 12–16 Eldridge Street in 1886. Kahal Adath Jeshurun first bought numbers 14 and 16 from Holkhe Yosher for $23,000, before buying the lot at 12 Eldridge Street for $12,850. (Note: The cost of 14–16 Eldridge Street is about $727,093, while the cost of 12 Eldridge Street is about $406,224 in 2025.) Kahal Adath Jeshurun hired Peter and Francis Herter, two Catholic brothers from Germany, as the synagogue's architects. The brothers had never previously designed a synagogue and, at the time, had designed only five structures in the city. That June, the Herter brothers drew up plans for a synagogue at 12–16 Eldridge Street, between Canal and Division streets. Their initial plans called for a 900-seat Moorish-style structure to be constructed for $35,000. (Note: About $1,106,000 in 2025) The official plans were officially filed that July, and modified plans were filed that September. There is very little extant documentation regarding the Herter brothers' design process, and the original drawings have been lost.

Work on the building began the final week of September 1886. The congregation took out a $50,000 mortgage loan (Note: About $1,581,000 in 2025) from the East River Savings Bank. Early plans for the building called for twin towers made of stone, but this was eliminated, likely due to monetary constraints. The synagogue also included stars of David and stained glass windows on its facade. The synagogue cost $91,907.61, (Note: About $2,905,000 in 2025) a high expense for the time. For comparison, Beth Hamedrash Hagodol's building had cost that congregation $55,000 in 1885. (Note: About $1,689,000 in 2025)

==== Completion ====
Kahal Adath Jeshurun's Eldridge Street Synagogue was dedicated on September 4, 1887. The congregation sent out thousands of invitations for the opening, and the crowds reportedly overflowed onto the street. The opening ceremony was widely reported in both secular and religious media, but the congregation's own archives do not describe the dedication in detail. Contemporary publications praised the synagogue's design. Several Jewish publications wrote that Kahal Adath Jeshurun itself was a paragon for other Eastern European Orthodox congregations, while a commentator for The American Israelite criticized the congregation's rowdy behavior. In subsequent weeks, the Jewish Messenger described the temple as often being overcrowded to the point where the police had to be called.

The synagogue contrasted with the densely packed tenements around it, where most congregants lived (though some wealthier members lived in brownstone row houses not far away). Its construction coincided with the development of several Jewish businesses nearby, including a religious-goods store next door. One of the congregation's members, Gittel Natelson, operated a mikvah (ritual bath) directly behind the synagogue at 5 Allen Street, which was not directly associated with or physically connected to the synagogue. Natelson had operated a mikvah next to Beth Hamedrash's previous building, and her husband Isaac, the congregation's sexton, owned the site of the new mikvah.

== Congregational use ==
=== 1880s to mid-1910s: Congregational heyday ===
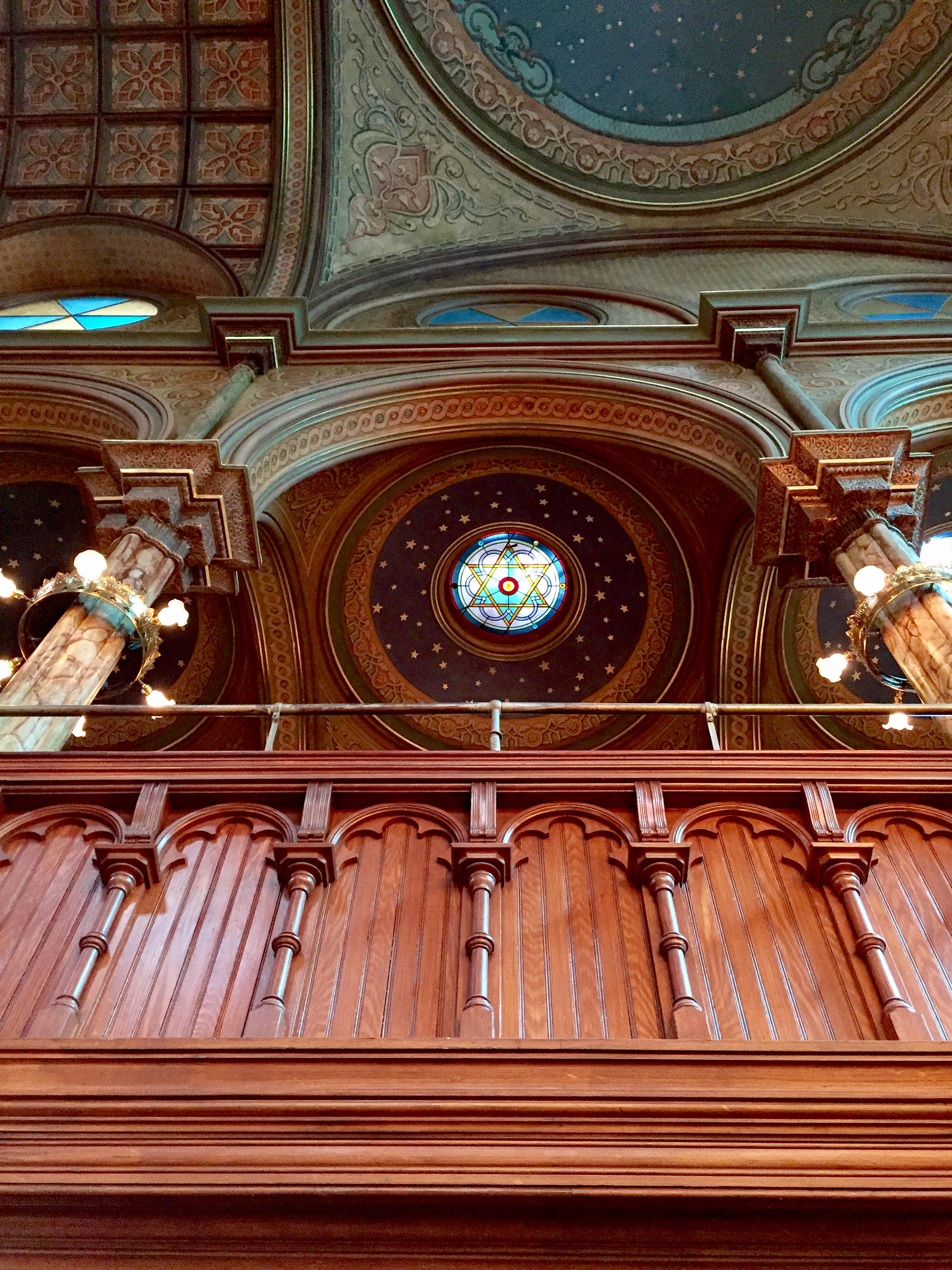
Balcony and ceiling detail

According to the historian Annie Polland, the congregation peaked between 1890 and 1915. The congregation officially changed its name to Kahal Adath Jeshurun in 1890, having used that name informally for six years. Starting in 1894, the synagogue allowed homeless persons to take shelter during Passover. The same year, the interior of the sanctuary was repainted with trompe-l'œil patterns, and the woodwork was modified to appear like marble. The Union of Orthodox Jewish Congregations of America was established at the synagogue in 1896, and thereafter it held meetings there biannually. By the beginning of the 20th century, the congregation regularly added seats during the High Holidays to accommodate additional worshippers. The synagogue was electrified in 1907.

Jews in New York City, including three of the congregation's first four presidents, were increasingly living elsewhere in the city during the 1900s and 1910s, since they could more easily access the synagogue using public transit. The congregation's leadership first considered constructing a second branch uptown in 1903 and 1907 to accommodate members who could not travel downtown on Shabbat (the Jewish day of rest). Some worshippers formed an offshoot synagogue uptown in 1909, and Congregation Anshe Lubz was merged into Kahal Adath Jeshurun that year. Kahal Adath Jeshurun took in Anshe Lubz's 125-member congregation, and it inherited two burial plots and $3,500 from the latter congregation. (Note: About $89,569 in 2025) The new members opposed an uptown synagogue, prompting a legal dispute that lasted two years; the New York Supreme Court ultimately ruled against the uptown synagogue's supporters. The congregation became Kahal Adath Jeshurun with Anshe Lubz in 1913 when a new set of rules was adopted.

==== Leadership ====
The highest-ranking clergy member at Kahal Adath Jeshurun was the cantor rather than a rabbi. Kahal Adath Jeshurun had no regular rabbi for about a year after the synagogue building opened. The congregation was part of the Association of American Orthodox Hebrew Congregations (AAOHC), which was looking for a chief rabbi who would serve all of these congregations. Jacob Joseph was hired as the chief rabbi in 1888, but the various members of the AAOHC were unable to agree on key values even after he was hired. Joseph spoke at the Eldridge Street synagogue exactly once in 15 years, and Kahal Adath Jeshurun's worshippers often disregarded his decrees. Worshippers also disagreed among themselves on what their priorities should be. The congregation hired at least 21 temporary rabbis from 1890 to 1914; they did not hold leadership positions, but they led study groups and taught lessons. Between 1905 and 1910, the congregation employed two separate maggidim, or preachers, whose role mainly consisted of preaching and discussing the Torah. Gurock writes that the congregation had no maggidim at all after 1910.

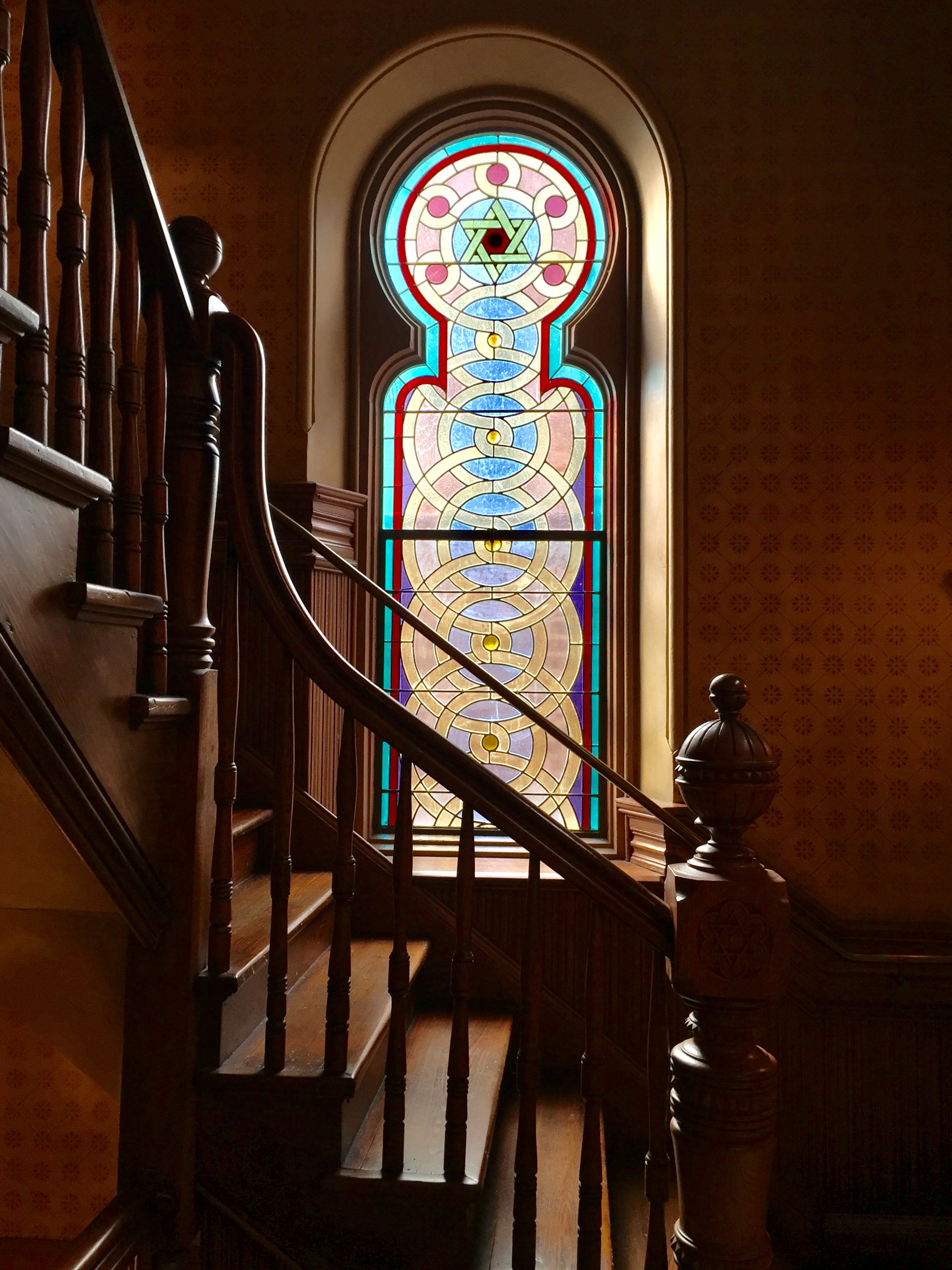
A stained glass window next to the synagogue's stairwells

The congregation had started looking for a cantor only one month before the Eldridge Street Synagogue was completed. Kahal Adath Jeshurun hired Pinchas Minkowsky (Note: Minkowsky's first name is variously spelled Pinhas or Pinchas. His last name has sometimes been spelled as Minkowski.) from Odesa as their cantor, hiring him for five years. To entice Minkowsky to join the congregation, its leaders agreed to pay him $2,500 per year, (Note: About $89,583 in 2025 (Note: 1634–1699: McCusker, J. J. (1997). How Much Is That in Real Money? A Historical Price Index for Use as a Deflator of Money Values in the Economy of the United States: Addenda et Corrigenda (PDF). American Antiquarian Society. 1700–1799: McCusker, J. J. (1992). How Much Is That in Real Money? A Historical Price Index for Use as a Deflator of Money Values in the Economy of the United States (PDF). American Antiquarian Society. 1800–present: Federal Reserve Bank of Minneapolis. "Consumer Price Index (estimate) 1800–".)) as well as a stipend and six weeks' annual vacation, at a time when the average worker earned less than $500 annually. (Note: About $17,917 in 2025) Both religious and secular journalists lauded Minkowsky's work during his tenure at Kahal Adath Jeshurun. Minkowsky returned to Odesa in 1892, possibly because of a dispute over a bonus that the congregation could not afford. Thereafter, Kahal Adath Jeshurun hired cantors only by the month, paying them a much lower rate of $30 per month. (Note: About $1,075 in 2025) In the 18 years following Minkowsky's resignation, the congregation employed 13 cantors.

The lay leadership, which included the president, vice president, and treasurer, was dominated by some of the congregation's wealthiest members. The first four presidents were Sender Jarmulowsky, kosher-food merchant Isaac Gellis, real-estate developer David Cohen, and glass magnate Nathan Hutkoff. The president held considerable power over the congregation, outranking even the rabbi and maggidim. The president was in charge of fundraising, hiring, maintenance, dispute resolution, and educational programs, among other activities. Because the first presidents were all wealthy men, they sometimes bought gifts or gave out loans using their personal money. The synagogue originally had 12 trustees, which was raised to 18 in 1913. It did not formally have any women leaders until 1919, when the congregation established a ladies' auxiliary, which helped arrange events and prepare meals among other activities.

==== Membership ====
As many as 800 families were members of the congregation through the 1920s. One source from 1892 described the worshippers as including "lawyers, merchants, artisans, clerks, peddlers, and laborers". Contemporary commentators characterized the synagogue as insular and resistant to cultural influence, but Polland writes that the congregation's members did adapt their customs to American culture. For example, in 1889, worshippers celebrated the 100th anniversary of the first inauguration of George Washington. Worshippers hailed from all over Eastern Europe, in contrast to other synagogues nearby, which largely catered to people from specific regions. Many of Kahal Adath Jeshurun's regular worshippers were also members of a second congregation associated with their home region.

Congregants paid a fee for membership, which included a pew, the right to vote on congregational matters, and other privileges including burial rites. Men older than 50 had to pay a higher fee, but the fee was waived completely for men over 60, and members' sons could also join for free. Women could not apply membership on their own merits until 1907, when the congregation allowed widows to join; other women were not allowed to become members, or vote on congregational issues, until the 1920s. The congregation was actively encouraging wealthy widows to join by the late 1910s. Cantorial performances commonly drew visitors, particularly during the High Holidays—the period between Rosh Hashanah (Jewish New Year) and Yom Kippur—when infrequent worshippers came to the synagogue. During these times, police were stationed in the street for crowd control.

Initially, people paid varying fees for their seats based on what they could afford, and the congregation did not turn away members for being penniless. Each individual pew was sold or rented, thereby creating seating assignments. The most expensive seats originally cost $500 a year, (Note: About $17,917 in 2025) but for $150 to $200, a member could buy permanent rights to a seat. (Note: About $5,375–7,167 in 2025) The pews were sometimes resold for a considerable profit or bequeathed. Pews further back were cheaper, and the majority of worshippers paid reduced dues. By 1898, four out of every five worshippers paid less than $40 a year, (Note: About $1,433 in 2025) and the poorest members were even allowed to pay nothing. Some worshippers rented their pews, sometimes paying in installments. Worshippers who rented pews could not vote on certain issues, and only pew owners could be elected to some lay leadership positions until 1913, a policy that favored wealthier members.

==== Customs and rules ====
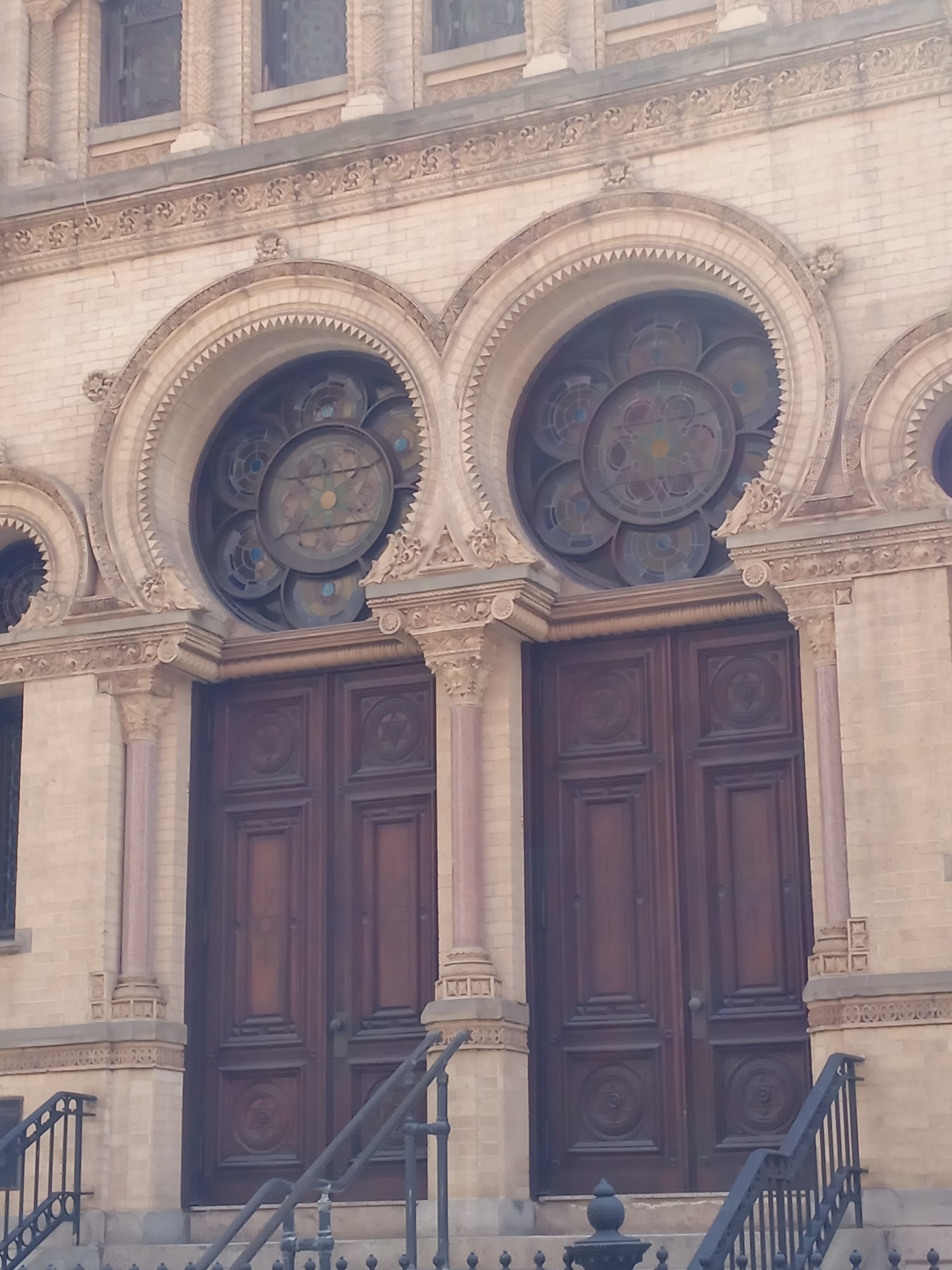
The center doorways of the Eldridge Street Synagogue, which lead to the main sanctuary's first story

Although many Eastern European Jewish New Yorkers at the time worked six-day weeks, they were required to observe Shabbat as a prerequisite for membership. In conformance with Orthodox tradition, the congregational leaders agreed to not play the organ during services, and men and women sat on different levels and did not sing together. If these rules were violated, congregants could be refunded twice the fees they had paid. Women sat on the balcony, while children of either gender sat in the rear rows when the synagogue was crowded.

Similarly to other Orthodox congregations, Kahal Adath Jeshurun conducted services in Hebrew, used a full-length prayer book, and worshipped around a central bimah (pulpit) rather than a bimah at the front. The services differed slightly in that each weekly Torah portion was read by a single person, rather than seven different people. Members were called to the bimah several times a year for Torah blessings and were required to pledge at least $4 annually for such blessings. (Note: About $143 in 2025) On most weeks, there would be blessings from at least five members, and physical and verbal disputes sometimes arose when congregants tried to make blessings simultaneously. By the 1910s, the congregation had reduced the required annual pledge and adopted a rule to limit the duration and quantity of blessings.

According to Gurock, Kahal Adath Jeshurun's leaders wanted to "Americanize" the congregation and privately feared that non-Jewish passersby would see the worshippers engaging in uncouth behavior. Thus, they banned spitting, loud talking, and foul language, and they hired ushers who regularly fined congregants for violating these rules. The congregation bought several dozen spittoons to discourage spitting, which was commonplace as many congregants chewed tobacco. Members could be expelled for violating the rules, and the congregation's board could also refuse to accept prospective members who were determined not to have the correct "moral character". However, this still failed to prevent the frequent fistfights that took place inside.

Local organizations, such as Hebrew schools, also used the Eldridge Street Synagogue. The congregation often donated money to Talmud Torah and yeshiva schools, raised money, and allowed the nearby Yeshiva Etz Chaim to use its space. Though the synagogue did also host a Talmud Torah of its own, the school was small and operated only for a short time in the 1900s.

=== Shrinking membership and structural decay ===
==== Late 1910s to 1940s ====
By the late 1910s, the worshippers increasingly wished to be led by a rabbi rather than a president, and they hired Avraham Aharon Yudelovitch as their rabbi in 1918. Several worshippers established a group in 1922 to study the Mishnah (a compendium of Oral Torah traditions) and the Ein Yaakov (a collection of Aggadah folklore). Membership dwindled in the 1920s as the wealthy members moved to other areas. The Immigration Act of 1924, which imposed strict quotas on immigration, further limited the number of new arrivals. The crowds declined from over a thousand to a few hundred.

The ladies' auxiliary continued to organize events, hoping to reduce the number of congregants leaving. Additionally, in 1925, Kahal Adath Jeshurun installed three plaques in the sanctuary to honor the ladies' auxiliary, the lay leadership, and 10 members; one plaque was left blank. Despite the declining membership, many worshippers remained at least somewhat involved with the congregation after moving away. Some of these former members donated to the congregation, while others come back for special events and holiday services. Although the Eldridge Street Synagogue had been a popular wedding site in its heyday, after 1927, the synagogue did not host another wedding for several decades.

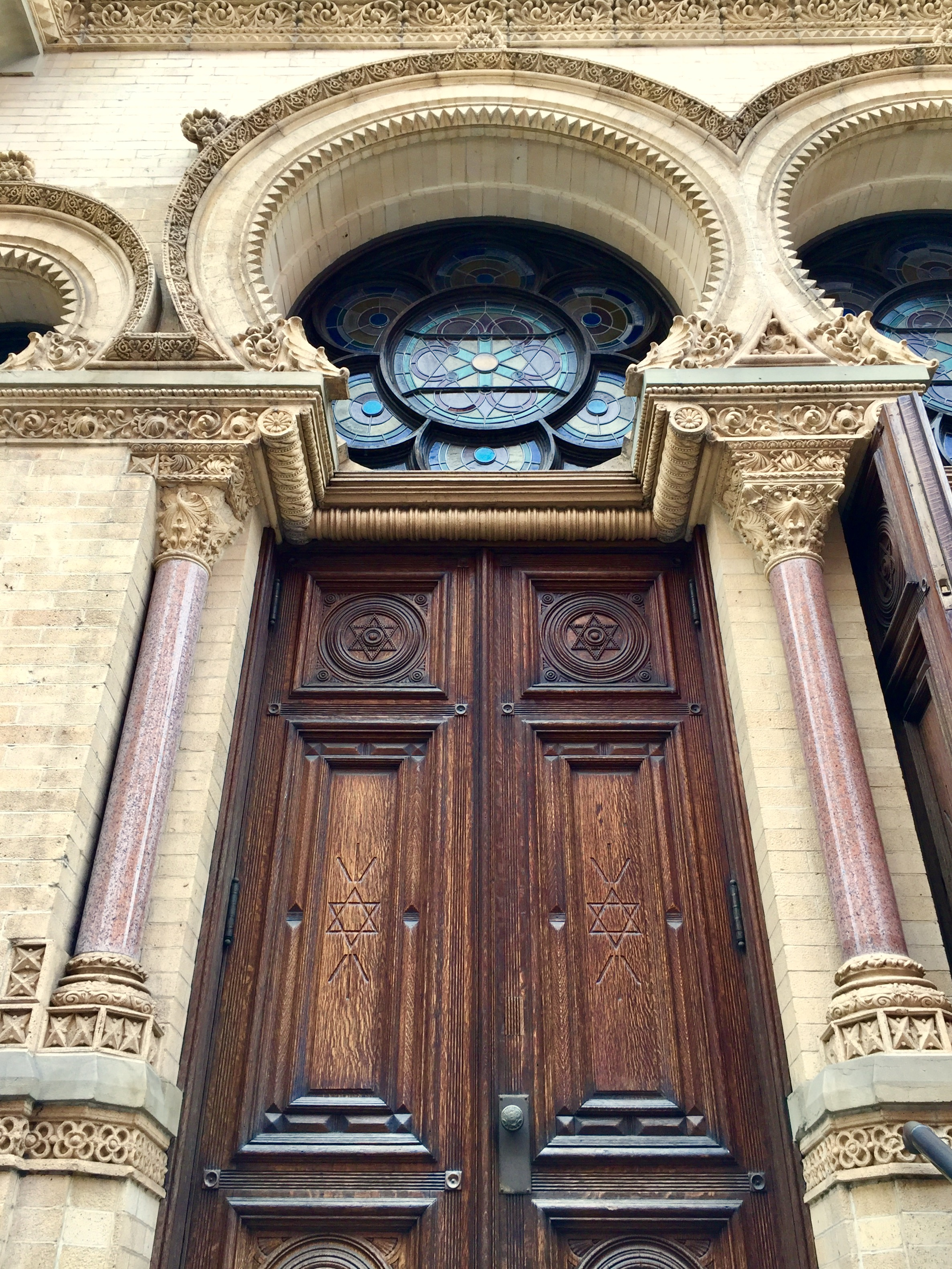
Front door with Moorish Revival detailing

Yudelovitch died in 1930, and Idel Idelson replaced him as the rabbi. Even as other synagogues in the area were acquired by Christian congregations in the 1930s, the Eldridge Street Synagogue remained a Jewish house of worship. The historian Gerard Wolfe writes that the main sanctuary had been closed to regular worship as early as 1933. The synagogue still held large events, such as the funeral of Menahem Mendel Beilis in 1934, which had 4,000 attendees. Over the years, the main sanctuary became largely vacant and was used mainly for special events. The more intimate beth midrash (study hall) in the basement was used for regular services. By the 1930s and 1940s, the congregation was increasingly focused on maintenance, but the exodus of wealthier worshippers meant that such funds were no longer available. The congregation was regularly sending letters to former members, asking them to donate.

As early as 1939, the congregation was recorded to have dwindled to fewer than 50 people. With membership quickly declining, the congregation sought to raise money to pay off the synagogue's mortgage before former members stopped coming even for occasional visits. The rear rose window was smashed during a 1938 hurricane, but the congregation did not restore it. Instead, the rose window was replaced in 1944 with glass blocks, which were designed to resemble four tablets. The congregation took ownership of the synagogue after the remaining worshippers made their last mortgage payment in October 1944, upon which there were 25 regular attendees. The synagogue still had up to 400 people during High Holidays, including the families of former members. Idelson served as rabbi until he died in 1943. After World War II, Max Fuchs became the synagogue's cantor; he later recalled that he was the last cantor to lead High Holidays services.

==== 1950s to 1970s ====
The exodus of congregants increased following World War II, and even the holiday events began to taper off. By 1954, the congregation had relocated to the basement-level sanctuary. Wolfe writes that the main sanctuary was sealed off with little apparent warning. Items such as shawls and prayer books still remained on the pews several decades later. The congregation was unable to repair or even heat the main sanctuary due to a lack of money. Benjamin Markowitz became the congregation's sexton in the mid-1950s and retained that role for several decades. During the latter half of the 20th century, the congregation continued to host Shabbat services, but they sometimes struggled to assemble a minyan, or quorum, of ten men for regular services. In some cases, they had to go to local yeshivas or nearby stores to find the requisite ten men.

Wolfe first visited the synagogue in 1971 after convincing Markowitz to help him enter the boarded-up main sanctuary. By then, the building had sustained severe water damage. Pigeons were entering the building through the holes in the partially collapsed roof, and one of the interior stairways had completely collapsed. Murals in the sanctuary had been damaged by the rain with holes in the balcony. The facade was dirty due to accumulations of soot, and the interiors were dusty. There were scattered objects and decomposing Torahs throughout the synagogue. The remaining members of Kahal Adath Jeshurun lacked funding to repair the toilets or reopen their safe. In spite of the water damage, many original decorations remained intact, albeit dirty, and the space had not been vandalized. During the 1980s, the stained glass windows were removed due to disrepair.

== Restoration and museum use ==
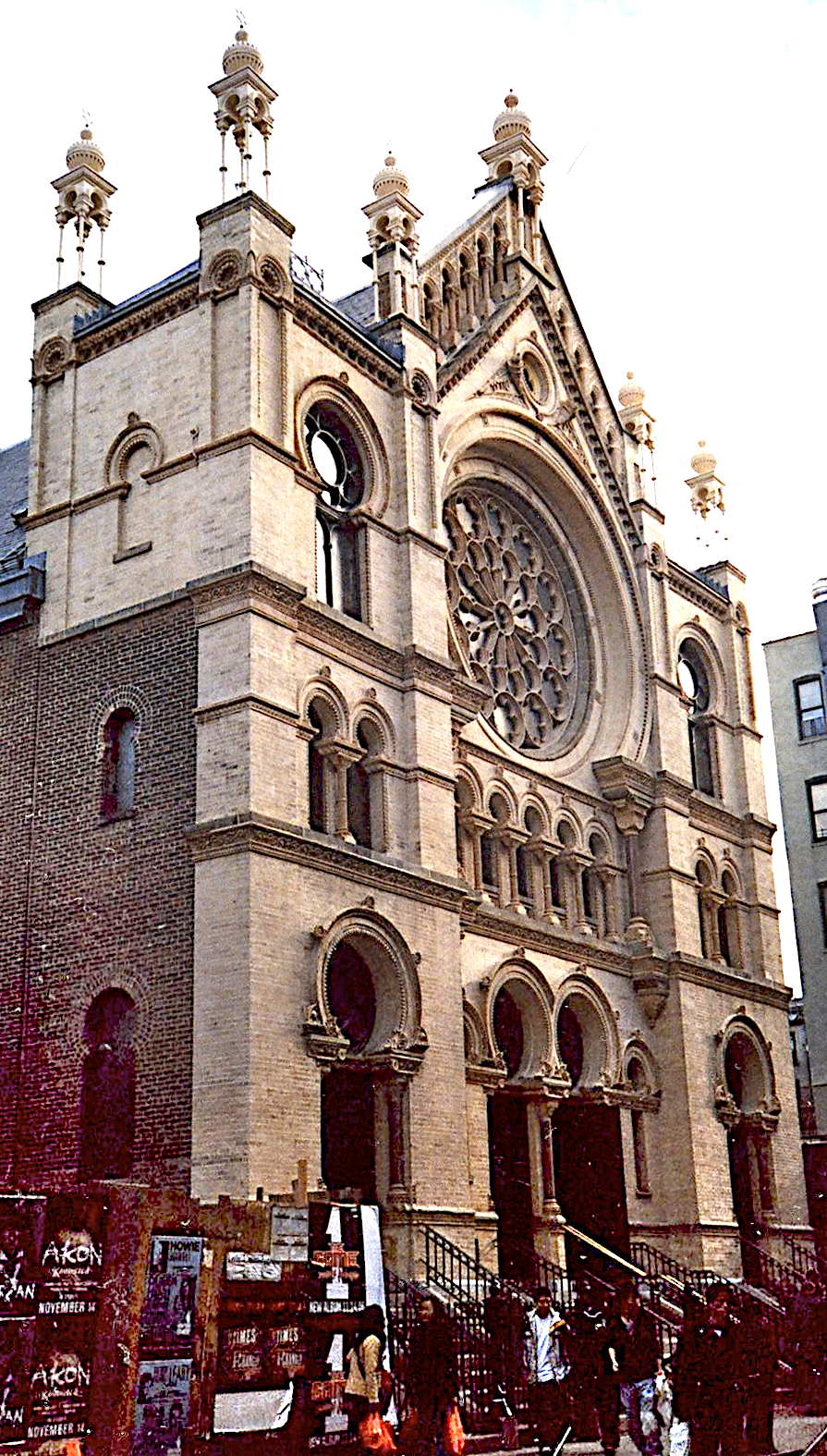
Eldridge Street Synagogue facade in 2006

Wolfe was giving tours of the building by the mid-1970s, and local preservationists identified the synagogue as among the neighborhood's most elaborate remaining synagogues. In a later book, Wolfe recalled that he and several other people had established the Synagogue Rescue Project in the 1970s to stabilize the building and turn the lights and heat back on. The group applied for the building to be designated a New York City landmark and added to the National Register of Historic Places, and they began raising money to stabilize the main sanctuary. The landmark designations were ultimately granted in 1980.

=== Early restoration efforts ===
Wolfe formed a partnership with several other men associated with Kahal Adath Jeshurun, including the judge Paul P. E. Bookson (who was the congregation's president) and the lawyer Steven L. Schwarcz. These men created Friends of the Eldridge Street Synagogue in 1978. They received around $100,000 from several organizations, (Note: About $387,000 in 2025) including a $38,000 matching-funds grant from the U.S. government and $15,000 from the UJA-Federation of New York. (Note: The amount received from the U.S. government is about $147,000, while the amount received from the UJA is about $58,000 in 2025) The group had to raise the rest of the matching funds by the beginning of January 1984, and they had raised $10,000 from the local community by November 1983. (Note: About $27,000 in 2025) In addition, they received $34,000 from two funds operated by the New York Landmarks Conservancy. (Note: About $92,000 in 2025) Other events, such as tours and dinners, were hosted to raise money for the restoration. Consolidated Edison, which had turned off the synagogue's electricity due to unpaid bills, agreed to permanently forgive these debts.

The UJA-Federation of New York repaired the roof in 1984. The architect David Abramson, a son of one of Kahal Adath Jeshurun's board members, oversaw a $78,000 stabilization of the building. (Note: About $212,000 in 2025) Schwarcz, whose grandfather had been one of the congregation's board members, raised funds for the synagogue and convinced his company to represent the congregation pro bono. The synagogue was rededicated in September 1984. In the long run, Friends of the Eldridge Street Synagogue wanted to open a museum in the synagogue.

By the mid-1980s, most of the Jewish population in the neighborhood had moved away. At the time, the neighborhood was largely Chinese and Hispanic. Kahal Adath Jeshurun's congregation had dwindled to 15 or 20 paying members. Newsday described the remaining members as seniors on fixed incomes, who still struggled to form a minyan for regular services. Though the congregation was still able to host services every week, Markowitz said he sometimes had to ask passersby to join the minyan. The congregation hired safecrackers in 1985 to take their artifacts out of the synagogue's old safes, which had not been opened in three decades and were in danger of falling through the weakened floor. Though the objects were valued at up to $40,000, (Note: About $102,000 in 2025) the objects were placed in storage rather than being sold.

=== Eldridge Street Project renovation ===
==== 1980s ====
In 1986, the non-sectarian, nonprofit Eldridge Street Project was founded to restore the synagogue and develop activities and events for it. The organization leased the building from Kahal Adath Jeshurun for 99 years. Roberta Brandes Gratz, the Eldridge Street Project's director, had learned about the synagogue from a friend. Work on restoring the main rose window started that September. The organization planned to raise $3 million for restoration. They received money from the Kaplan Fund, Astor Foundation, James Wolfensohn, and the Reichmann family, as well as from Jewish organizations. The state gave the Eldridge Street Project a $150,000 grant for restoration and structural improvements in 1987, followed by another $150,000 grant for museum programs the following year. Because the building was a city landmark, it also received city funds for preservation.

The Eldridge Street Project had raised $1.5 million by 1987 and hired Giorgio Cavaglieri to design a renovation of the building. Cavaglieri estimated that the building needed $3 million in repairs, half of which was just for structural stabilization. The restoration was split into three phases. The firm of Robert Meadows was hired to design the first phase of the restoration, which cost $2.5 million. Restoration work began in 1989. At the beginning of the project, a skeleton was found in the basement of the synagogue. After further investigations revealed that the skeleton was that of a young man who had died decades before, the bones were interred in Kahal Adath Jeshurun's burial plots. The congregation continued to pray in the former rabbi's study during the restoration.

==== 1990s ====
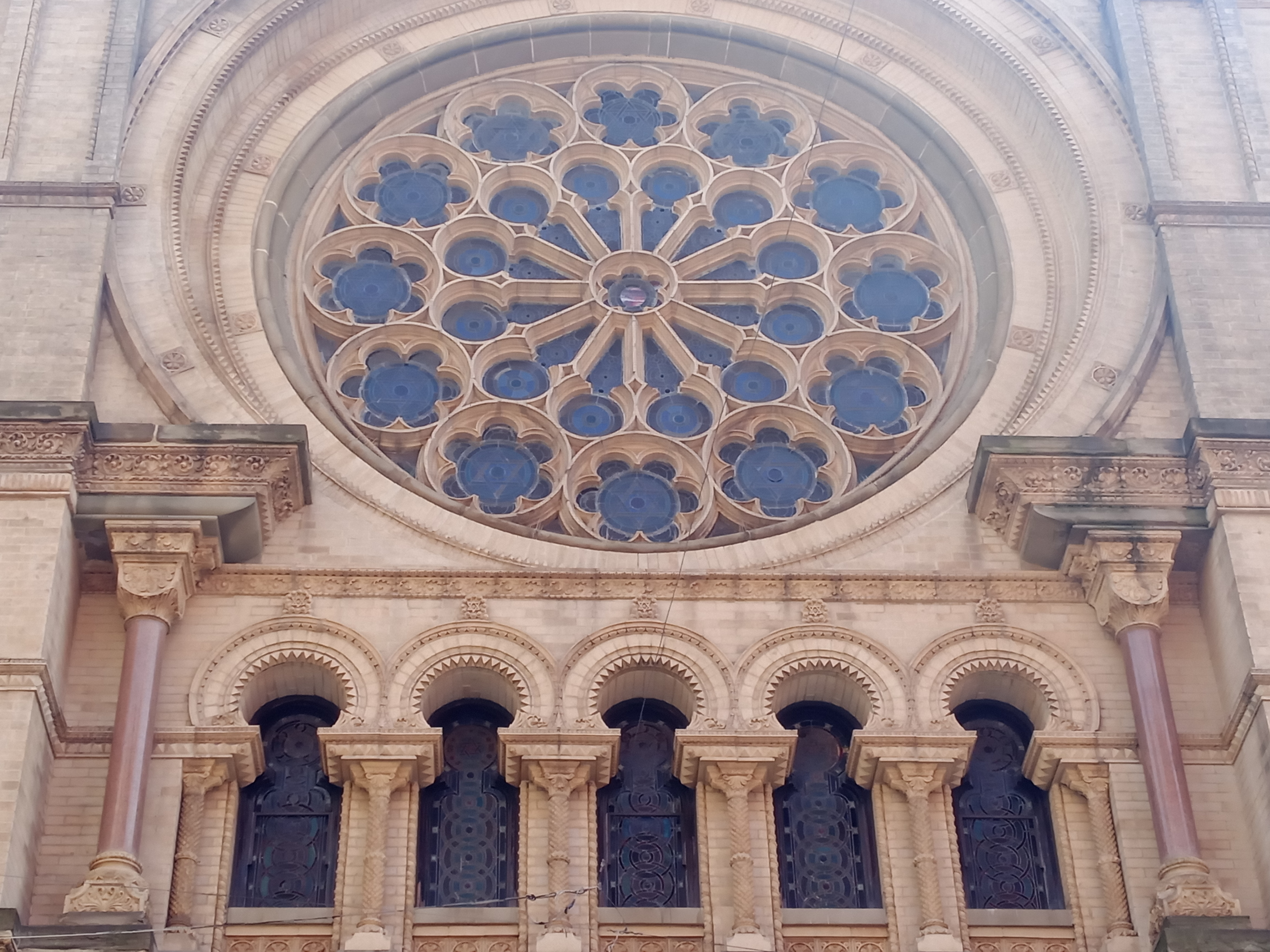
The western facade's rose window and the second-story windows below it

By 1990, workers were reinstalling the synagogue's pews. The Eldridge Street Project became a member of the American Alliance of Museums in 1991 and began hiring full-time employees the same year. The museum also became part of the Council of American Jewish Museums, and volunteers gave tours and oversaw "Clean and Shine Days" at the synagogue. Workers expanded the basement to provide space for new mechanical systems. After the initial renovation was completed in 1991, work on the next phase stalled due to funding shortages. The sanctuary was empty, and many of the decorations had been temporarily removed or placed in storage. The organization also intended to install new mechanical and electrical systems, but this required another $6 million.

Even when raising money, the Eldridge Street Project sponsored tours of the partially restored sanctuary, hosted presentations and exhibits, and launched programs for local students. Between 1991 and 1993, the organization recorded 6,000 visitors on its tours. The New York Landmarks Conservancy gave the synagogue a $10,000 grant for restoration in 1994, which the Eldridge Street Project's director, Amy Waterman, said would be used to replace the decorations on the roof. That year, the main sanctuary hosted its first bar mitzvah in four decades. By then, the building had thousands of annual visitors. The organization also planned to raise money for a Jewish history center and restore the rest of the synagogue. By 1996, the Eldridge Street Project had raised $3 million.

The congregation remained small, with about 40 or 50 members in the mid-1990s. Even though they continued to meet for weekly Shabbat services without exception, it had no rabbi. Bookson, the congregation's president, did not expect the congregation to grow, but he did hope to move back into the main sanctuary once the renovation was complete. During the renovation, worshippers sometimes had to wear hard hats. The synagogue's new roof was completed in May 1999, allowing interior restoration to proceed.

==== 2000s ====
The New York City government gave the Eldridge Street Project $1 million for the synagogue's restoration in 2000, after the organization had raised $4.5 million for renovation and museum programs. The New York Civil Liberties Union expressed concerns that the grant violated the First Amendment to the United States Constitution, which required the separation of church and state; however, city officials and Gratz said the grant was going to the non-sectarian Eldridge Street Project for preservation only. An archeologist rediscovered the old Allen Street mikvah within a construction staging area behind the synagogue in 2001. The Eldridge Street Project provided limited tours of the synagogue, which accommodated up to 20,000 people a year by the mid-2000s. The organization also sponsored exhibitions, concerts, speeches, and other events. Although the congregation had grown slightly, it was still small, and services were still being held in the basement. The Forward reported in 2004 that Kahal Adath Jeshurun had 30 families.

Due to municipal budget cuts, the city reneged on another promised grant of $1 million for interior restoration in 2003. This shortfall was covered by funding from other organizations, such as Save America's Treasures. At the time, the Eldridge Street Project was installing an elevator and stair, and it also wanted to install new roof decorations, audiovisual equipment, and Wi-Fi equipment. The Eldridge Street Project also asked the New York City Landmarks Preservation Commission (LPC) to fund the restoration of the rooftop finials, which included stars of David. The LPC's rules prohibited the agency from financing the restoration of religious icons, and the LPC agreed to grant $25,000 for a portion of the roof that did not include the stars of David.

The Eldridge Street Project had raised $8 million for the renovation by 2005. The third phase of the restoration included plaster replacement, paint removal, conservation, new stenciling, wood finishing, and decorative painting. Seaboard Weatherproofing and Restoration was hired to restore the facade, while Walter Sedovic and Jill H. Gotthelf were hired to redesign the interior. By 2005, workers had installed scaffolding inside the main sanctuary in preparation for its restoration. Workers then cleaned, repainted, and repaired the interior. The finials above the roof were reinstalled in March 2006, and the stained glass window above the main entrance was restored in September 2007. A genealogical research center in the former rabbi's study was never finished. Ultimately, 18,000 people donated to the project. A third of the funding came from the New York City government, while the rest was supplied by various governmental agencies, organizations. and individual donors, such as the publisher Mortimer Zuckerman.

=== Post-renovation ===
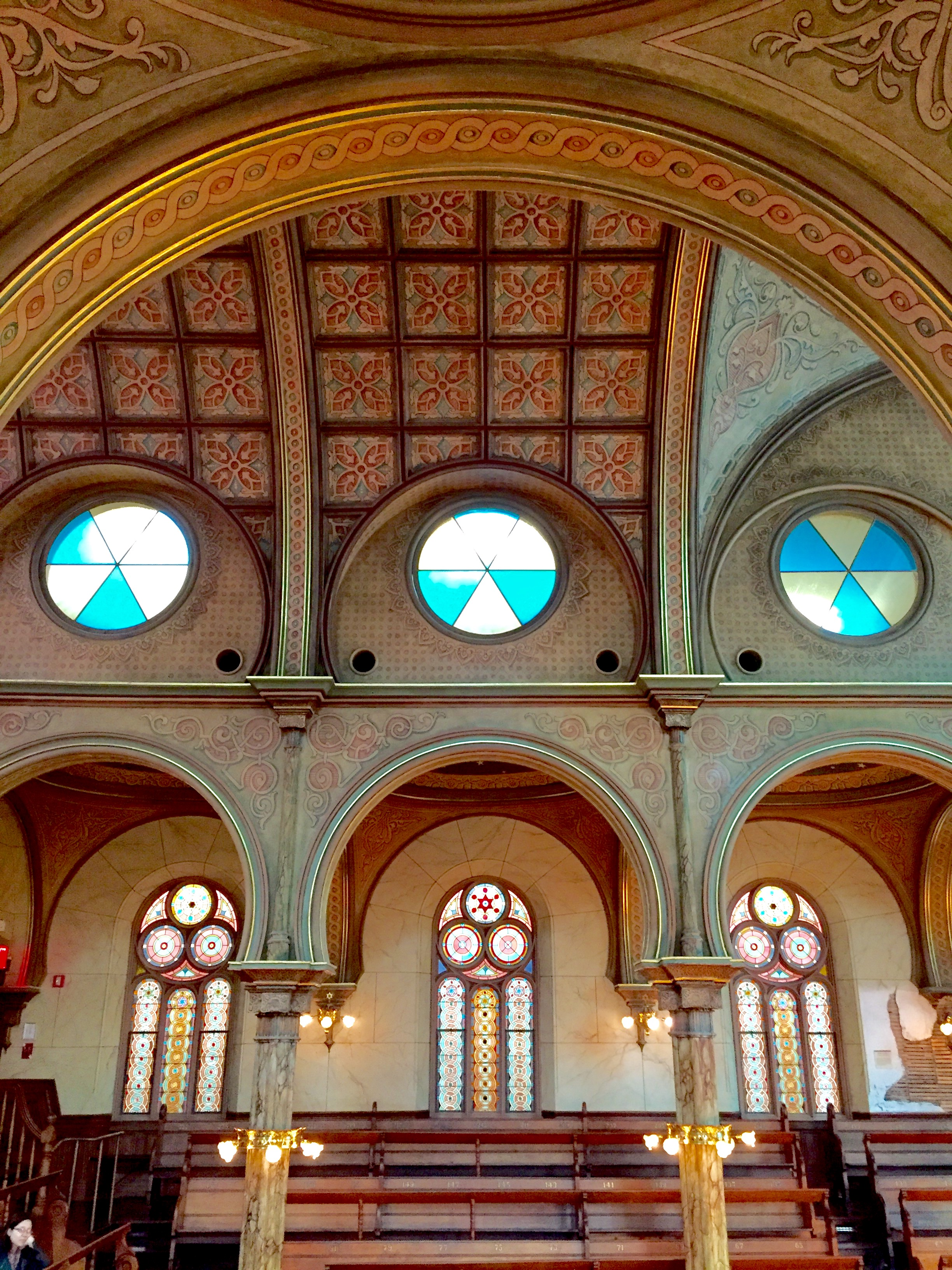
Arched stained glass windows

On December 2, 2007, the synagogue was rededicated following the completion of its $20 million renovation. The Eldridge Street Project was renamed the Museum at Eldridge Street, reflecting its cultural and educational mission. Initially, the museum was closed on Fridays, Saturdays, and American and Jewish holidays. Kahal Adath Jeshurun remained at the synagogue, though it still had few members, and there were often not enough people to form a minyan on weekdays or for Friday-night Shabbat services. The presence of the surrounding Chinese businesses reflected the decreased demand for religious services at the synagogue.

The Museum at Eldridge Street sold the site of the Allen Street mikvah in 2008 for $4.5 million. The rear rose window had not been replaced in the initial renovation because there were no extant records of the original window. Members of the Museum at Eldridge Street initially disagreed over whether the window should be retained, restored to approximate its original appearance, or replaced with a completely new design. They ultimately received 12 proposals. In 2009, Kiki Smith and Deborah Gans were hired to design a stained-glass rose window. The window was installed in October 2010; Amy Milford said the new window was inspired by the sanctuary and also "completes it".

In the four years after the synagogue's renovation, the Museum at Eldridge Street had attracted 100,000 visitors, and there were 35,000 visitors in 2011 alone. In addition, the museum was named a Preserve America Steward in 2010 for its restoration of the synagogue. The Advisory Council on Historic Preservation wrote at the time that dozens of volunteers conducted weekly tours, maintained the exhibits, and organized over 50 annual events. By 2014, the synagogue building attracted 40,000 annual visitors. The museum opened another temporary exhibit space, the Michael Weinstein Gallery, in 2016. By the late 2010s, the congregation used the synagogue on Saturdays, while the museum operated the other six days of the week. Due to the COVID-19 pandemic in New York City, the Museum at Eldridge Street temporarily closed in March 2020 before reopening in June 2021. A mosaic floor designed by Mark Podwal was added to the synagogue in 2024.

== Building ==
The synagogue occupies a land lot at 12–16 Eldridge Street, on the eastern side of the street, measuring approximately 60 by 87.5 feet (18.3 by 26.7 m) across. The building itself is rectangular and measures 53 by 79 feet (16 by 24 m) across, with windows facing alleys to the north and south. When the synagogue was completed, all the surrounding structures were tenement houses, so its design was intended to contrast with that of the surrounding buildings. The site is historically part of the Lower East Side of Manhattan, but it has also been part of Chinatown since the late 20th century, when the Chinese population of the area increased.

The synagogue is largely designed in the Moorish Revival style, with Gothic Revival and Romanesque Revival elements spread throughout. The building was designed by the architects Peter and Francis William Herter, who also designed tenements. The design has mistakenly been attributed to the similarly named Herter Brothers firm (composed of Christian and Gustave Herter). Peter and Francis Herter are credited with 60 buildings in Lower Manhattan, including 50 just on the Lower East Side. Many of these buildings' facades contain decorations that are also used in the Eldridge Street Synagogue, such as horseshoe arches and Stars of David. The Herters were not Jewish and may have decided to use the Moorish style after seeing it in their native country of Germany.

=== Exterior ===
The foundations are made of stone and descend 10 feet (3.0 m) below ground, while the perimeter walls above the ground are made of brick masonry. The inner faces of the perimeter walls contain wooden joists, which hold up wooden girders. Originally, the synagogue had 67 or 80 stained-glass windows, made of panes in 12 colors. Following the 2007 renovation, over 85% of the original stained-glass panes remained intact.

==== Main elevation ====
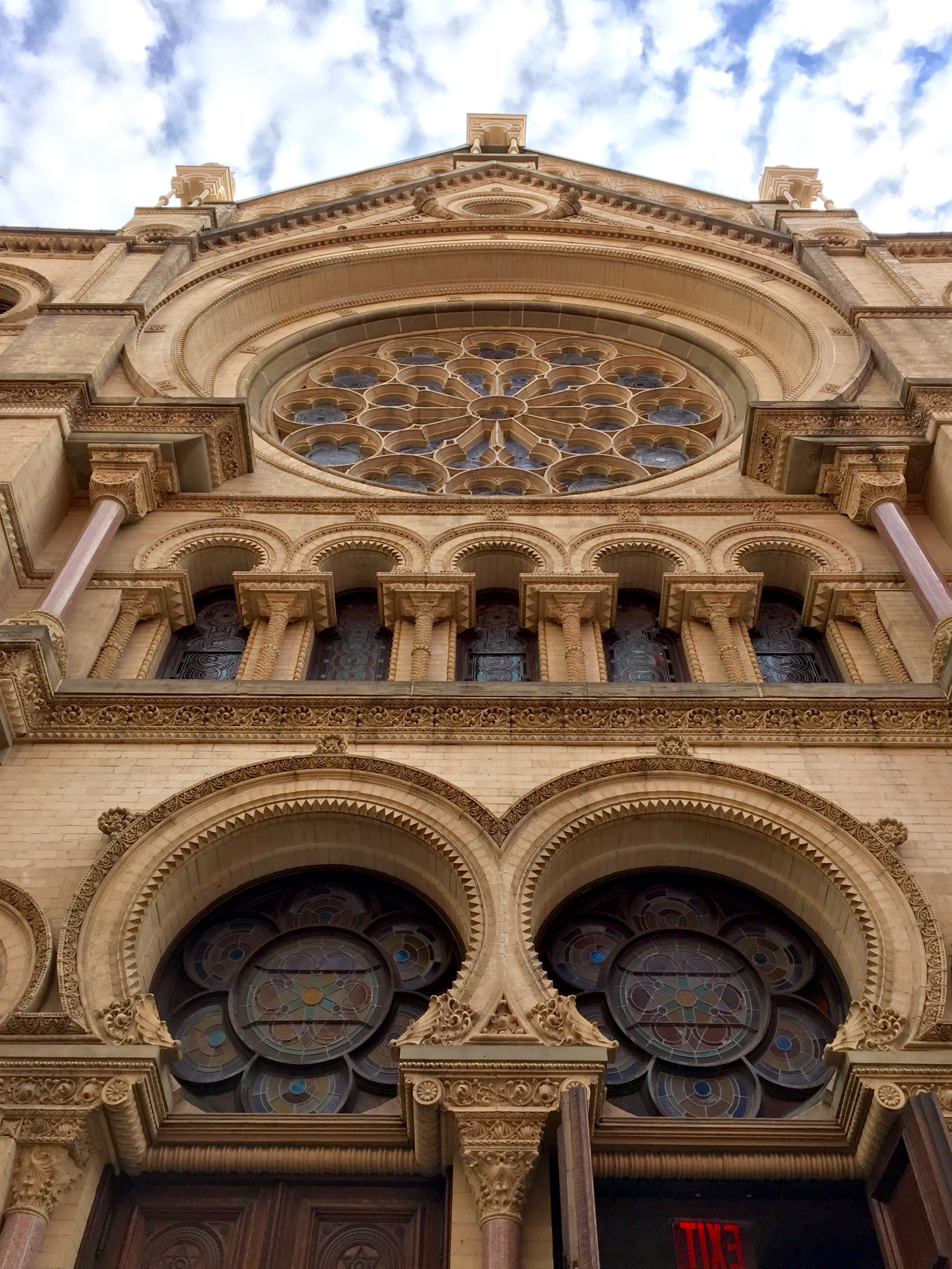
Exterior Moorish Revival details

The main elevation of the facade faces west toward Eldridge Street. The basement is clad in granite and brick. Above the basement, the facade is made of brown or buff-colored brick with terracotta details. String courses run horizontally across the facade above the first and second stories. The west elevation is also divided into three vertical bays, with two square staircase towers on either side of a recessed central bay. Elements, such as windows and doors, are grouped in quantities that correspond to significant numbers in Judaism, such as 3 (representing the three patriarchs), 4 (the four matriarchs), 5 (the five books of Moses), and 12 (the Twelve Tribes of Israel). According to the writer Annie Polland, the elaborate details of the synagogue's facade may have been intended to express the idea that Orthodox Jews could both assimilate into American culture and retain their Orthodox identity.

The synagogue is set back from the street, and a cast-iron fence runs in front of its entrance. Behind the cast-iron fence, three stairways ascend to the first-floor entrances, with one stairway to each bay; the center stairway is divided into two by a railing. The center stairway was intended for male congregants and the outer stairway for female congregants. Between the outer and central staircases are two additional stairs, which descend to the basement. At the first story, the outer towers each have two doors, while the central bay has four doors. The doors are made of wood, with carvings that depict the Star of David, and are flanked by pilasters. Above the doorways are brick-and-stone horseshoe arches, decorated with molded dog-tooth patterns. The center four arches are additionally flanked by a pair of narrow windows with horseshoe arches. On the second story, the central bay contains five windows within horseshoe arches, while the outer towers contain two such windows. A terracotta molding also crosses the facade at the second story, connecting the imposts of each of the arches on that story. The string course above the second story also protrudes into the central bay.

At the third story, the central bay includes a massive rose window, while each of the outer towers includes a large window within a horseshoe arch. The rose window is similar in design to those at Gothic-style Christian churches, though unlike these churches, it originally had a Star of David. The window also contains a dozen roundels, which depict the Twelve Tribes of Israel. Above the central bay is a triangular gable with a parapet made of horseshoe arches. The parapets above the side towers are flat. The original design included finials, aediculae (small shrines), and metal cresting, which were removed in 1960 and restored in 2006. The modern finials and aediculae are made of fiberglass.

==== Other elevations ====
The other three elevations of the synagogue are clad in brick. On the northern and southern walls are round-arched windows with stained-glass panes, which overlook the main sanctuary inside. In addition, there are windows overlooking the basement. Most of the facade was rebuilt or repaired from 1986 to 2007, but a small patch of wall on the second story has been preserved in its pre-renovation state.

The rear elevation, above the synagogue's Torah ark, also has a rose window measuring 16 feet (4.9 m) wide. The exact design of the original rear rose window is unknown, but it was replaced with four glass blocks in the 1940s. By the 1990s, the rose window had been infilled with brick, and the wall had been painted. The current rear rose window was installed in 2010 and designed by Kiki Smith and Deborah Gans. The center of the rose window is made of yellow glass, surrounded by panes of blue. There are both six-pointed stars of David and five-pointed stars symbolizing the stars of the U.S. flag, representing the mixture of American and Jewish cultures. Gans described the stars in the window as a continuation of the "veil of stars" inside the sanctuary. Unlike older stained-glass windows, in which the different glass panes are separated by bulky lead strips, the panes in the rose window contains thin joints that cannot be seen from a distance. Instead, the stained-glass panes are glued to a sheet of clear glass using silicone. A 2-short-ton (1.8-long-ton; 1.8 t) steel frame surrounds the rose window. A local firm, Gil Studio, manufactured the window.

=== Interior ===
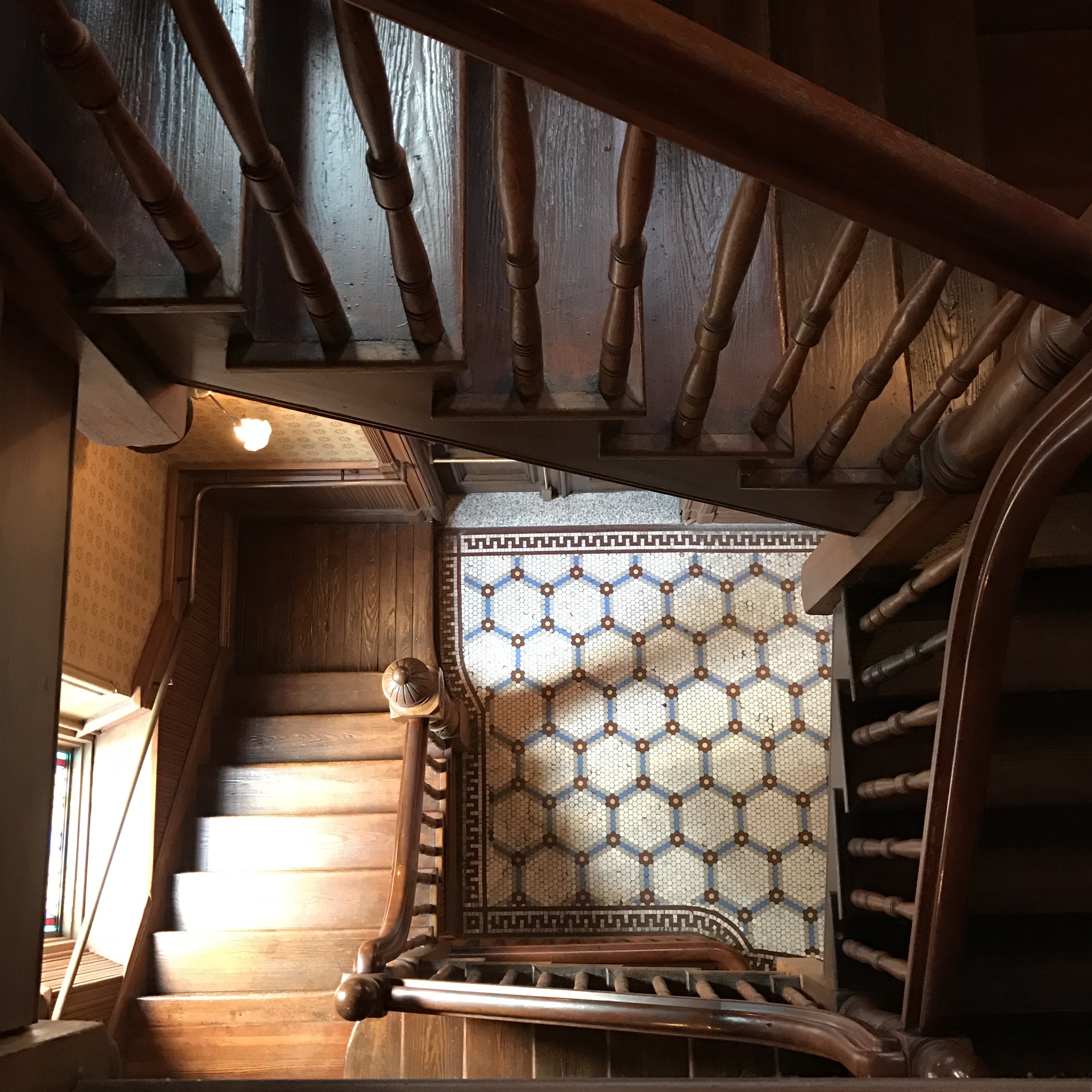
Interior staircase

The main and largest space is the sanctuary, which spans the depth of the synagogue at the first through third stories. In keeping with Orthodox Jewish custom, the rear of the synagogue faces east (in the direction of Jerusalem), and women and men had different seating areas and doorways. The center doorway led to the main level, used by men, and the outer doorways led to the balcony, used by women. The lights were gas-powered until the 1900s, when they were replaced with electric lamps. Though most of the interior was restored in the late 20th and early 21st centuries, there are two pieces of wall that were purposely never restored. The toilets also date from before the restoration. There are floor mosaics designed by the artist and physician Mark Podwal, which depict zodiac signs.

==== Sanctuary ====
The sanctuary's ceilings and walls were constructed using lath and plaster. The interior of the sanctuary's main (first) story is split into three sections from north to south. Each section is separated by an arcade of wooden columns, which support the second-story balcony and are decorated to give the appearance of marble. The capitals atop the columns are made of plaster, with gold leaf trim, and are decorated with seashell motifs. The ceiling above the central section contains barrel vaults and a dome measuring 70 feet (21 m) tall. The floor is made of wood. Over the years, congregants' footsteps and their back-and-forth shuckling during prayer have created grooves in the floor. There are also grooves in front of the lectern, where the cantor prayed.

The main level's eastern end contains a Torah ark, which was imported from Italy. Also known by its Hebrew translation (the aron kodesh), the ark is illuminated by numerous lightbulbs. The ark is installed within a small annex and can fit 24 Torah scrolls. It is elaborately carved in a style resembling the facade, and it is topped by wooden finials, as well as tablets containing the Ten Commandments. There is a raised lectern (amud) in front of the ark and behind a wooden balustrade. Next to the ark are several wooden seats, which were treated as the "seats of honor" and were often occupied by the lay leadership and visitors. In addition, the center of the main level contains a raised bimah, or pulpit, which is made of white pine. When the synagogue was built, many Orthodox synagogues used central bimahs, while Reform synagogues had their bimahs at the front, similar to a Christian church's pulpit.

A three-sided balcony runs along the western, northern, and southern walls. It originally provided seating for Kahal Adath Jeshurun's women, but it was converted into an exhibition space called the Use and Jeffrey Wilks Gallery in 2007. Unlike at older Orthodox synagogues, where grilles or walls separated women's and men's sections completely, the design of the balcony allowed men and women to easily see each other. The balcony had movable curtains to allow the women to hide themselves from the men, but in practice, the curtains were often drawn open. The balcony is raked, with the rear being higher than the front. The balcony's carved balustrade is made of wood. The northern and southern balconies are separated from the central bay by colonnades of wooden columns, which are decorated to give the appearance of marble. The capitals of these columns are made of plaster, and they support horseshoe arches, which in turn support the ceilings above the sanctuary's north and south sections. The ceilings are split into several bays from west to east; each bay consists of several small domes with pendentives at their corners. The barrel vault above the western section of the balcony was intended to make the space appear taller than it actually was.

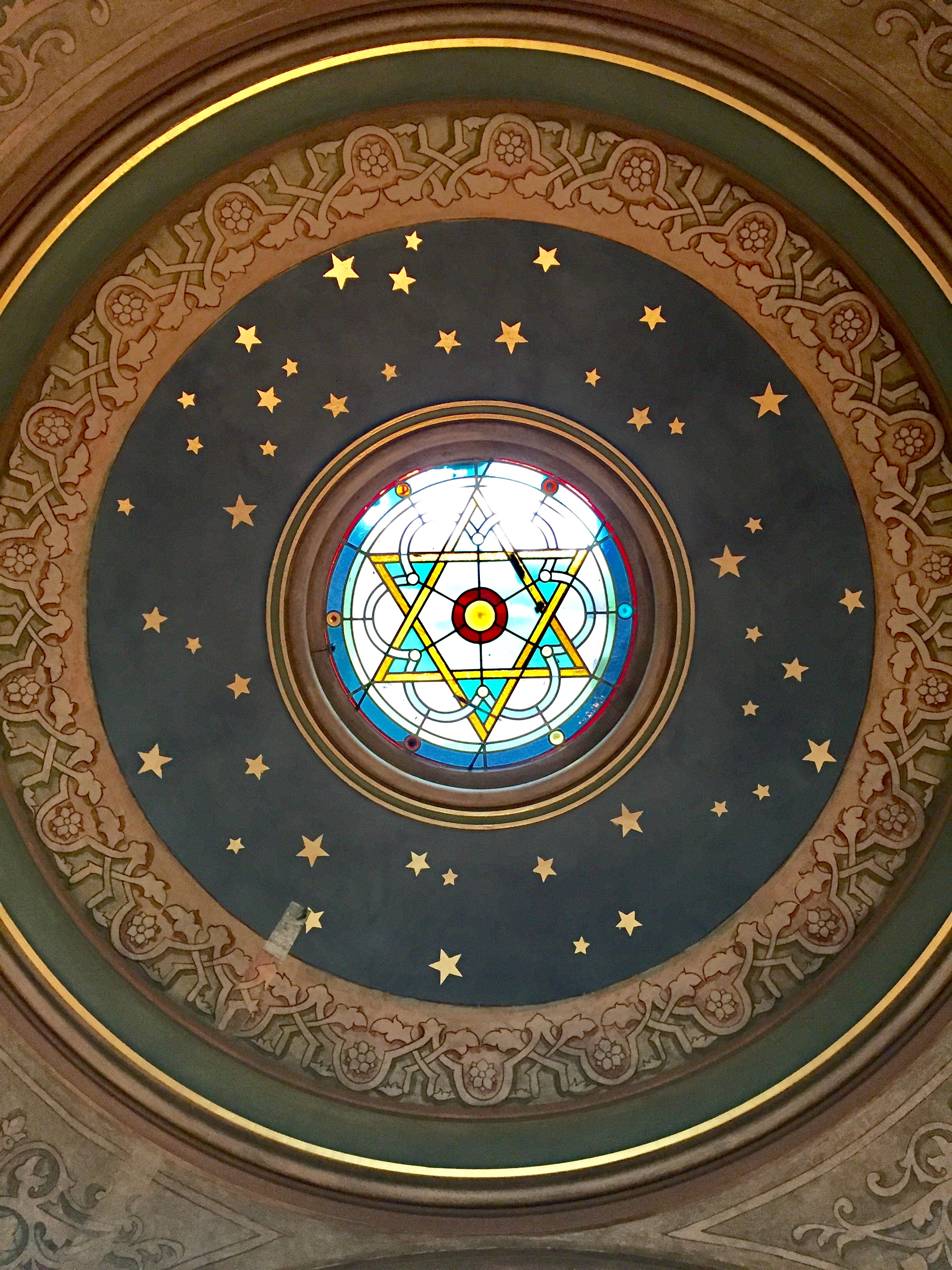
Ceiling dome

The spaces receive illumination both from the windows and from various brass lighting fixtures. There is a 75-bulb chandelier, as well as torchères. an eternal light, milk glass lamps under the balcony, and other lamps mounted to the walls and columns. The sanctuary has a variety of decoration. Molds were used to create the capitals of each column, while metal stencils were used to create the trim. In addition, numerous methods such as stencils and trompe-l'œil were used to create the decorations on the walls and ceilings. These surfaces include abstract, geometric, or natural motifs, including leaves, spades, and gold stars upon a blue background. Conversely, there are no depictions of humans or other figures, since the congregation believed such depictions might violate the Second Commandment ("Thou shalt not make unto thee any graven image"). There are trompe-l'œil patterns on both sides of the ark. The sanctuary was repainted at least twice: in 1896 and after the synagogue's electrification. During the 20th century, the sanctuary also had a toilet that was removed.

==== Other spaces ====
There were originally stairs and a foyer at the front or west end. The stair in the synagogue's northern tower collapsed in the late 20th century and was replaced by an elevator with a stair around it. One of the towers has a toilet on its third floor, which was installed in 1920. In addition, the foyer's floor has hexagonal tiles dating from the 1940s. The roof once had a skylight, but this was replaced with an asphalt roof in the 20th century.

The lower level was originally a study hall, known as the beth midrash, where Kahal Adath Jeshurun met after the mid-20th century. It includes some offices and a study room, as well as a rabbi's study with a hearth. The basement also includes a smaller, secondary ark. The beth midrash includes a donation box for tzedakah (charity), with six slots representing various causes. A toilet was built in the basement in 1920. After the synagogue reopened in 2007, the lower level was converted into the Cural-Rabinowits Family History Center, which included oral history recordings of synagogue members, as well as the Limud Center, a gallery with electronic displays about the neighborhood and Jewish history.

== Operation ==
In the 21st century, the synagogue functions as both a museum and a Jewish house of worship. Most of the synagogue is operated as a museum named the Museum at Eldridge Street. Kahal Adath Jeshurun with Anshe Lubz uses some of the basement spaces.

=== Museum ===
Museum at Eldridge Street
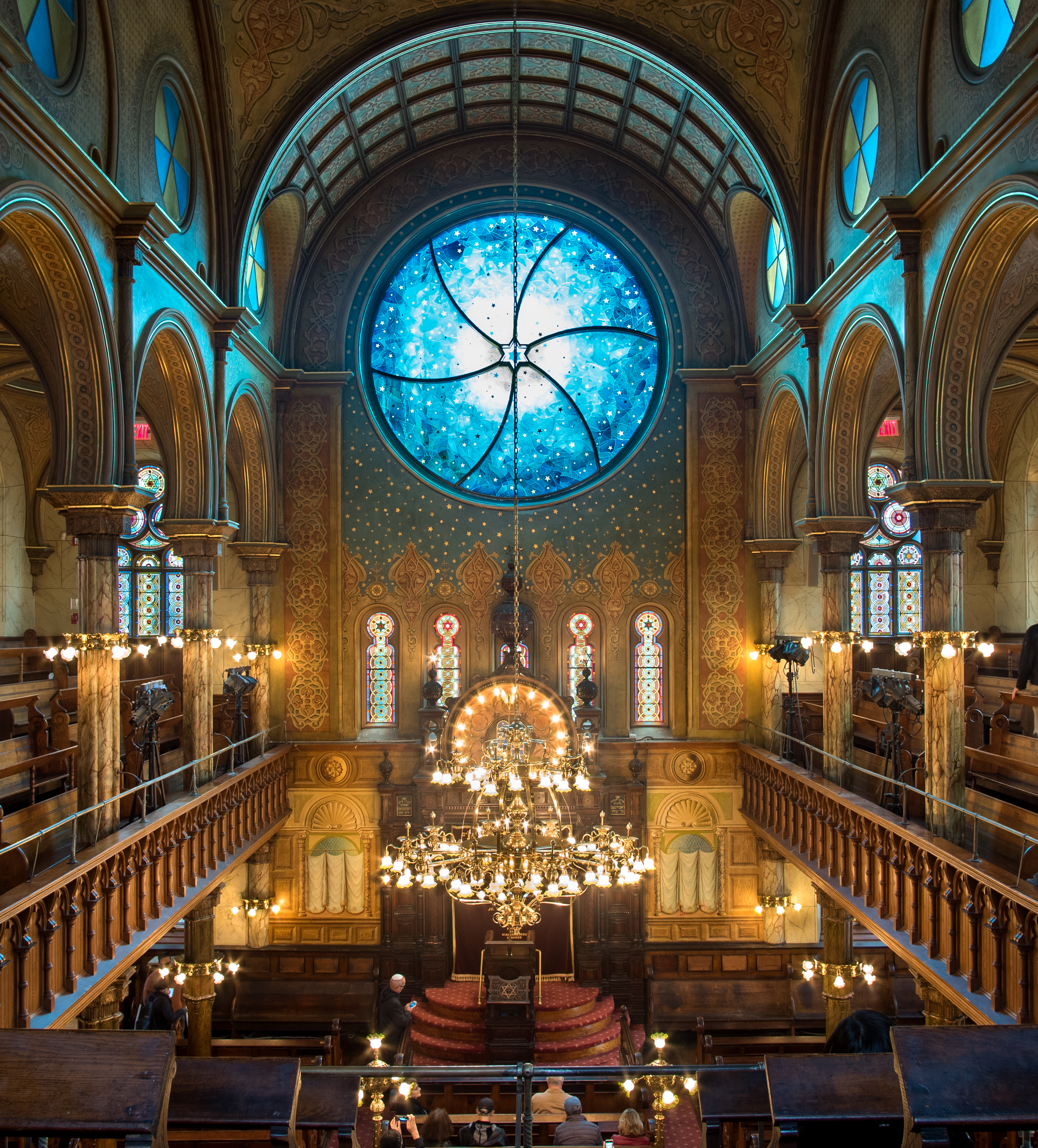
- Museum interior in 2018
- Established: 1986 (Eldridge Street Project); December 2, 2007 (gallery space)
- Type: Jewish museum
- Collections: American Jewish history
- Executive director: Bonnie Dimun
- President: Kenneth L. Stein
- Chairperson: Michael Weinstein
- Website: eldridgestreet.org

The Museum at Eldridge Street has been designated as a 501(c)(3) nonprofit organization since 1998. The modern-day museum includes exhibits and activities centered on the history of the congregation, the local community, and Jewish culture. As of 2024, its executive director is Bonnie Dimun. Michael Weinstein is the museum's chairman, while Kenneth L. Stein is its president.

==== Exhibits ====
When the museum opened, there were interactive digital kiosks throughout the synagogue. A permanent exhibition about the congregation's history opened in the basement in 2014. The exhibition includes a map of Jewish immigration patterns, a watercolor of the synagogue's facade, artifacts relating to local Jewish businesses, and exhibits about the synagogue's history and renovation. The museum also has information about the neighborhood's history, local organizations such as The Forward, and the broader Jewish community.

Prior to the completion of the renovation in 2007, the Eldridge Street Program hosted some temporary exhibits in the synagogue, such as an exhibit about immigration in 1999. Some of the synagogue's artifacts were exhibited at the Park Avenue Armory in 1989 and at the Christie's auction house in 2004. After the renovation was complete, the museum hosted temporary exhibits, such as an exhibit about Kiki Smith's work, an exhibit on old synagogues, a showcase on Jewish Chinese communities, and an exhibit on menorahs.

==== Events ====
During the 1990s and 2000s, the Eldridge Street Project hosted a variety of events and activities. These included a selection of recorded interviews with members of the congregation, a Jewish folk art festival, and music performances. The synagogue hosted a women-only event for the first time in its history in 2003, when it hosted performances by a female Orthodox Jewish musician (the custom of kol isha prevents men from hearing Orthodox women sing). The organization's programming also included mixed media, music, and readings, often incorporating elements of multiple cultures. Additionally, the synagogue hosted several parties to celebrate significant milestones in the renovation process.

Ever since the renovation was completed, the Eldridge Street Project has hosted events to attract local residents, including concerts, klezmer performances, lectures, tours, street fairs, and book readings. Notable such events have included theatrical performances by the Folksbiene in 2011, concerts and lectures in 2012 (for the 125th anniversary of the opening), and an opera about the Triangle Shirtwaist Factory fire in 2018. The museum's digital programming has included video interviews and a blog. The museum's "Egg Rolls, Egg Creams and Empanadas" festival, held each June since 2000, was organized as a tribute to the neighborhood's diversity. The festival includes music, writing, games, a food fair, and other activities. In addition, the museum has hosted activities such as arts-and-crafts projects and short films, as well as a monthly program in which children investigate the synagogue itself. Museum staff also give tours of the synagogue, which provide information about American Jewish history, the history of the Lower East Side, and immigration. There are special tours, such as Passover-themed tours, as well as a mobile app for self-guided tours.

=== Congregation ===
A small number of worshippers of continue to hold services at the synagogue in the 21st century. The modern congregation is formally known as Congregation Kahal Adath Jeshurun with Anshe Lubz (the name is sometimes spelled slightly differently). The congregation has rarely missed a Shabbat or holiday service since the synagogue first opened. The congregation hosts Hebrew-language Shabbat services on Fridays at sunset, as well as twice on Saturdays. Kahal Adath Jeshurun no longer has a full-time rabbi, and Jewish religious events are no longer celebrated in the former main sanctuary.

Notable worshippers over the years have included the entertainers Eddie Cantor, Edward G. Robinson, Paul Muni, Sam Jaffe (who also had his bar mitzvah at the synagogue), and Al Jolson. The artist Ben Shahn and the inventor Jonas Salk were also members, as was the rabbi Mordecai Kaplan.

== Impact ==
=== Reception ===
==== Architectural and museum commentary ====
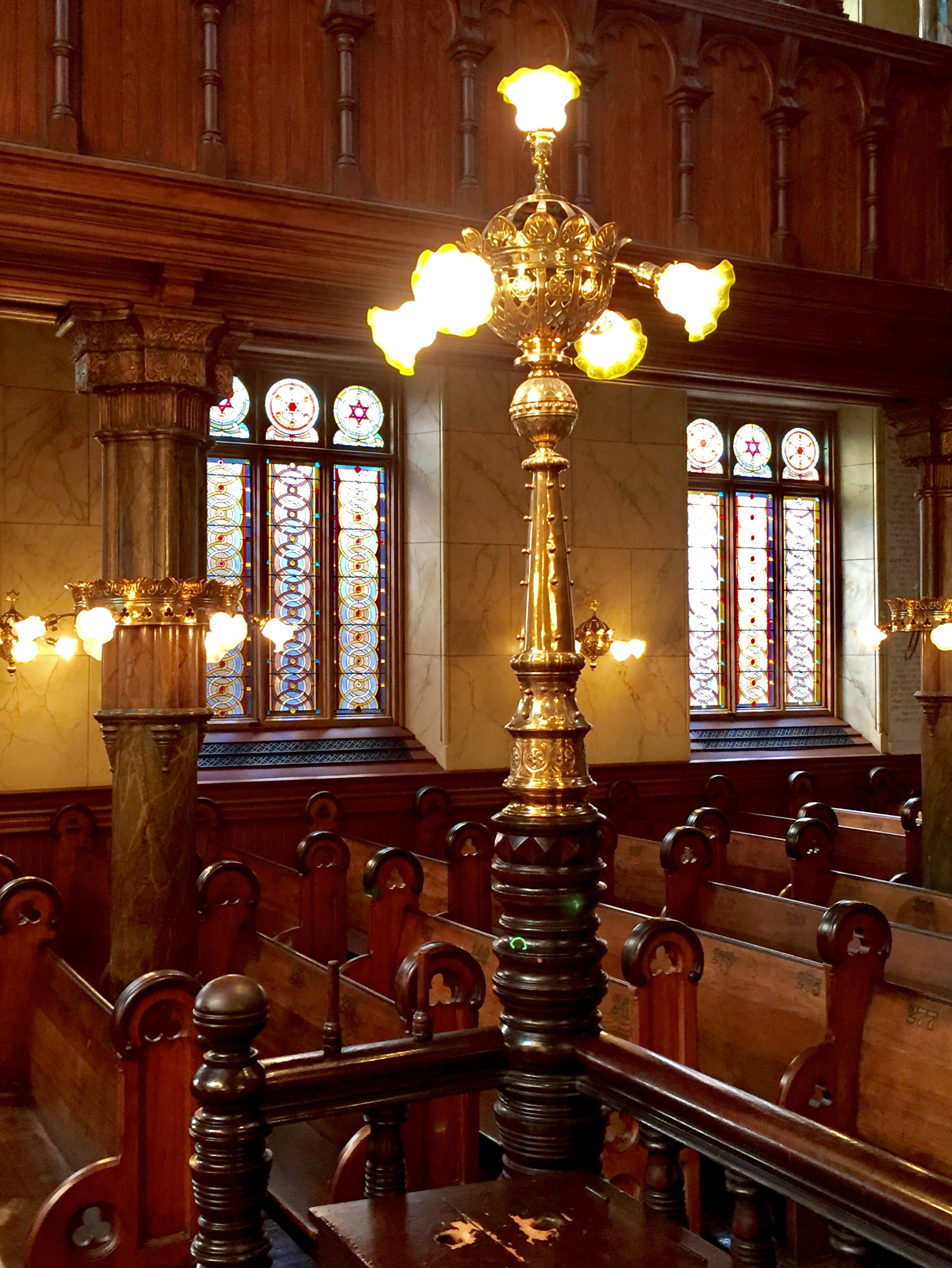
Brass and glass lighting fixtures at pew ends

When the synagogue was completed, Mi Yodea of The American Israelite described the building as standing out within its neighborhood, and he wrote that the interior was well-lit, spacious, and simple in design. Two Orthodox rabbis from other Manhattan congregations, Bernard Drachman and Pereira Mendes, said that the building's beauty would prevent congregations from defecting to non-Orthodox synagogues. Century Illustrated magazine called the synagogue "Byzantine, with touches of the Renaissance, [...] yet distinctively Oriental". Not all commentary was positive. One writer criticized the elaborate designs of the building as potentially conflicting with Orthodox values, saying that the money would be better spent on education. A 1905 Washington Post article described the Eldridge Street Synagogue as one of several imposing Orthodox synagogues on the Lower East Side. As late as 1938, the synagogue was referred to as "one of the large temples of downtown Manhattan".

Richard F. Shepard of The New York Times wrote in 1978 that, although the synagogue was "tarnished and grim", its architectural details were still formidable. Paul Goldberger referred to the synagogue in 1986 as "one of the finest pieces of synagogue architecture in the city". After the restoration had started, Goldberger cited the project as evidence of a belief that "a religious building is an anchor in time, a symbol of continuity as well as a vessel of meaning in the city". A writer for The Jewish Exponent said in 1988 that the building "still looks quite grand", citing the architectural details such as windows and columns. The Forward writer Jonathan Rosen stated in 1998 that the synagogue's "opulent interior has taken a terrible beating, but if anything the power of the place has only been enhanced by the passage of time". The same year, Mel and Ronnie Greenberg of the Jewish News wrote that the synagogue "was always known as the 'special occasions' synagogue and was considered an essential stop on the trail of the Jewish experience".

After the synagogue's renovation was completed, Adam Gopnik of The New Yorker said in 2007 that the synagogue was "almost hallucinatory in its luminosity, wedged in among the workaday tenements and Chinese storefronts like a bright and happy dollhouse." Edward Rothstein of The New York Times wrote, "Even now [...] it is possible to be awestruck by the exotic splendor of this meticulously restored sanctuary." A writer for The Washington Post wrote that the synagogue's dual use as a museum and congregation was a "sign of the times". A writer for The Forward expressed cautious optimism about the museum but said that the old congregation was still a fraction of its former self. Justin Davidson of New York wrote in 2008 that the high ceiling, stained glass, and false-marble columns signified "unimaginable splendor" and that the restoration had removed all traces of the former neglect. A writer for The Forward said in 2016 that the Museum at Eldridge Street was among the institutions that "might be essential to the [Lower East Side]'s Jewish future". In 2025, Time Out magazine ranked the Eldridge Street Synagogue among the world's most beautiful buildings, saying: "Today, it stands as both a museum and a symbol of resilience."

==== Symbolism and influence ====
One writer said in 2008 that the Eldridge Street Synagogue's existence symbolized the presence of Eastern European Jews in the United States, since previous large American synagogues were for Sephardic or German Jews. Similarly, the historian Jonathan Sarna wrote that the synagogue building signified how the Orthodox worshippers had "established a place for themselves within the American religious landscape". Annie Polland wrote that the synagogue's completion "signified a major step for downtown Jews and their desire to preserve tradition". Writers also saw the synagogue's design and presence as a rejoinder to ornate Reform synagogues uptown, such as Temple Emanu-El and Central Synagogue.

The structure also stood out because it was an Orthodox synagogue built specifically for that purpose, at a time when most purpose-built synagogue buildings in New York City were constructed by Reform congregations. Subsequent synagogues on the Lower East Side, both new and converted, were influenced by the design of the Eldridge Street temple. For example, several of these synagogues contained finials, which may have been based on those at the Eldridge Street Synagogue. Conversely, few other congregations in the neighborhood built freestanding synagogues.

=== Landmark designations ===
The Eldridge Street Synagogue was added to the National Register of Historic Places in March 1980 and designated as an official New York City landmark that July. At the time, it was one of three Lower East Side synagogues designated as city landmarks, along with the Bialystoker Synagogue and Beth Hamedrash Hagodol.

There were calls in the 1990s to designate the synagogue as a National Historic Landmark (NHL) as well, and it was designated as such in 1996. In their application for NHL status, preservationists called the building "the only surviving religious artifact to illuminate the spiritual and cultural lives of Eastern European immigrants" within the historically Jewish portions of the Lower East Side. Preservationists nominated the Lower East Side Historic District, which included the synagogue, for inclusion on the NRHP in 2000; the area was designated as a U.S. historic district the next year. The Eldridge Street Synagogue is one of five synagogues in the United States with NHL designation as of 2023, the others being Central Synagogue in Midtown Manhattan, Beth Sholom Congregation in Pennsylvania, Temple Aaron in Colorado, and St. Thomas Synagogue in the U.S. Virgin Islands.

=== Media ===
The synagogue has been depicted in numerous works of media. For example, drawings of the synagogue were published in a 1998 Hanukkah book, and it was used in 2020 as a filming location for the TV series Hunters. In addition, the writer Pete Hamill cited the rundown synagogue as an inspiration for a synagogue in his 1997 novel Snow in August. For the synagogue's 120th anniversary in 2007, the filmmaker Yale Strom took several pictures of klezmer musicians outside the synagogue, which was then made into a short film called A Great Day on Eldridge Street. The synagogue was detailed extensively in Annie Polland's 2008 book Landmark of the Spirit, and its subsequent renovation was described in Roberta Brandes Gratz's 2011 book Beyond the Facade.

== See also ==
- List of National Historic Landmarks in New York City
- List of New York City Designated Landmarks in Manhattan below 14th Street
- National Register of Historic Places listings in Manhattan below 14th Street
- Oldest synagogues in the United States
