= Eldridge Street =

Street in Manhattan, New York

Coordinates: 40°43′8.26″N 73°59′33.23″W

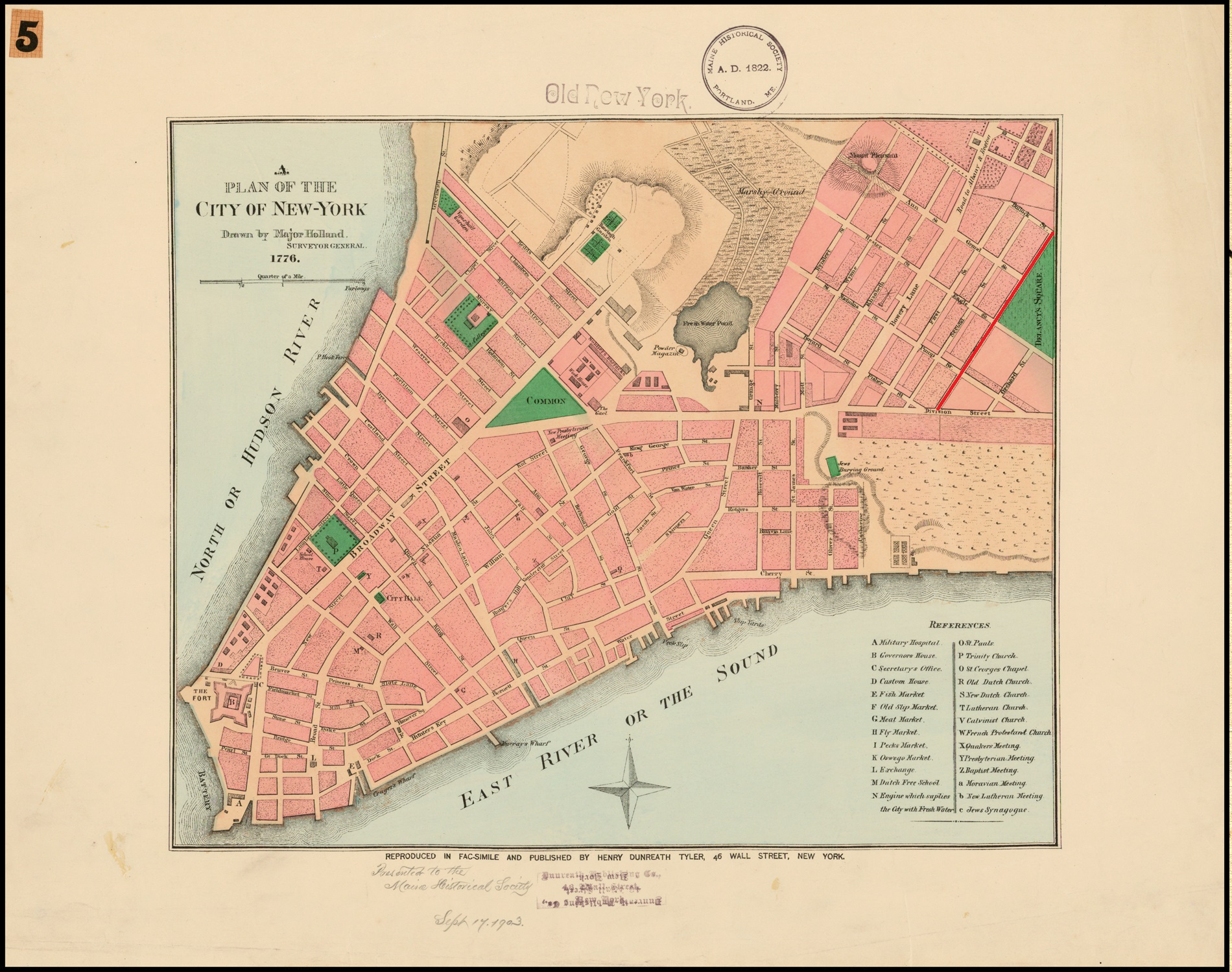
1776 map showing the location of Eldridge Street

Eldridge Street is a street on the Lower East Side of Manhattan in New York City. It extends north-south from East Broadway to Houston Street. Originally called Third Street according to the numbering system for the Delancey Farm Grid, it was named in 1817 for Lt. Joseph C. Eldridge, whose unit was ambushed by Indian allies of the British in Upper Canada during the War of 1812.

== Notable locations ==
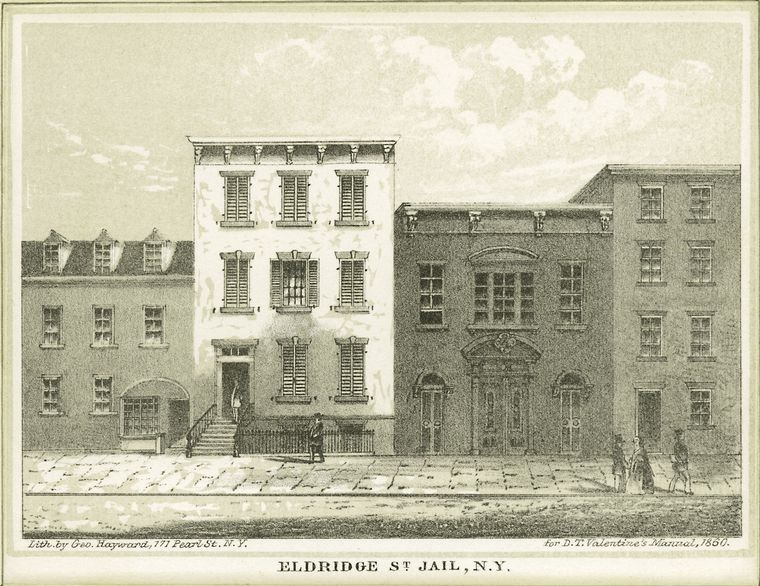
Eldridge Street Jail, second building from left. The fire station is to its right.

The Eldridge Street Synagogue at 12 Eldridge Street opened in 1887 and served Congregation Kahal Adath Jeshurun. It is one of the first synagogues in the United States erected by Eastern European Jews (Ashkenazis). Since 2007, the synagogue houses the Museum at Eldridge Street.

Eddie Cantor lived at 19 Eldridge Street.

20 Eldridge Street was Hook and Ladder Company Eagle No. 4 in the mid-19th century. Today the building, once two stories high, now five, is a Buddhist temple.

The New York County Jail, better known as the Eldridge Street Jail, was located at 22 Eldridge Street and operated from 1836 to 1862, when it was replaced by a new jail on Ludlow Street. The jail building started out as a three-story private home and before becoming a jail was first a school and then city watchhouse.

American lyricist Ira Gershwin was born at 60 Eldridge Street.

Musicians Thurston Moore and Kim Gordon of the American rock band Sonic Youth lived at 84 Eldridge Street in the 1980s.

105-107 Eldridge Street was the Eldridge Street Police Station from 1869 to 1912. Danish-American photographer and social reformer Jacob Riis took several photographs of the inmates there and documented their squalid living conditions in his 1890 book How the Other Half Lives.

Assafa Islamic Center is located at 172 Eldridge Street.

== Gallery ==
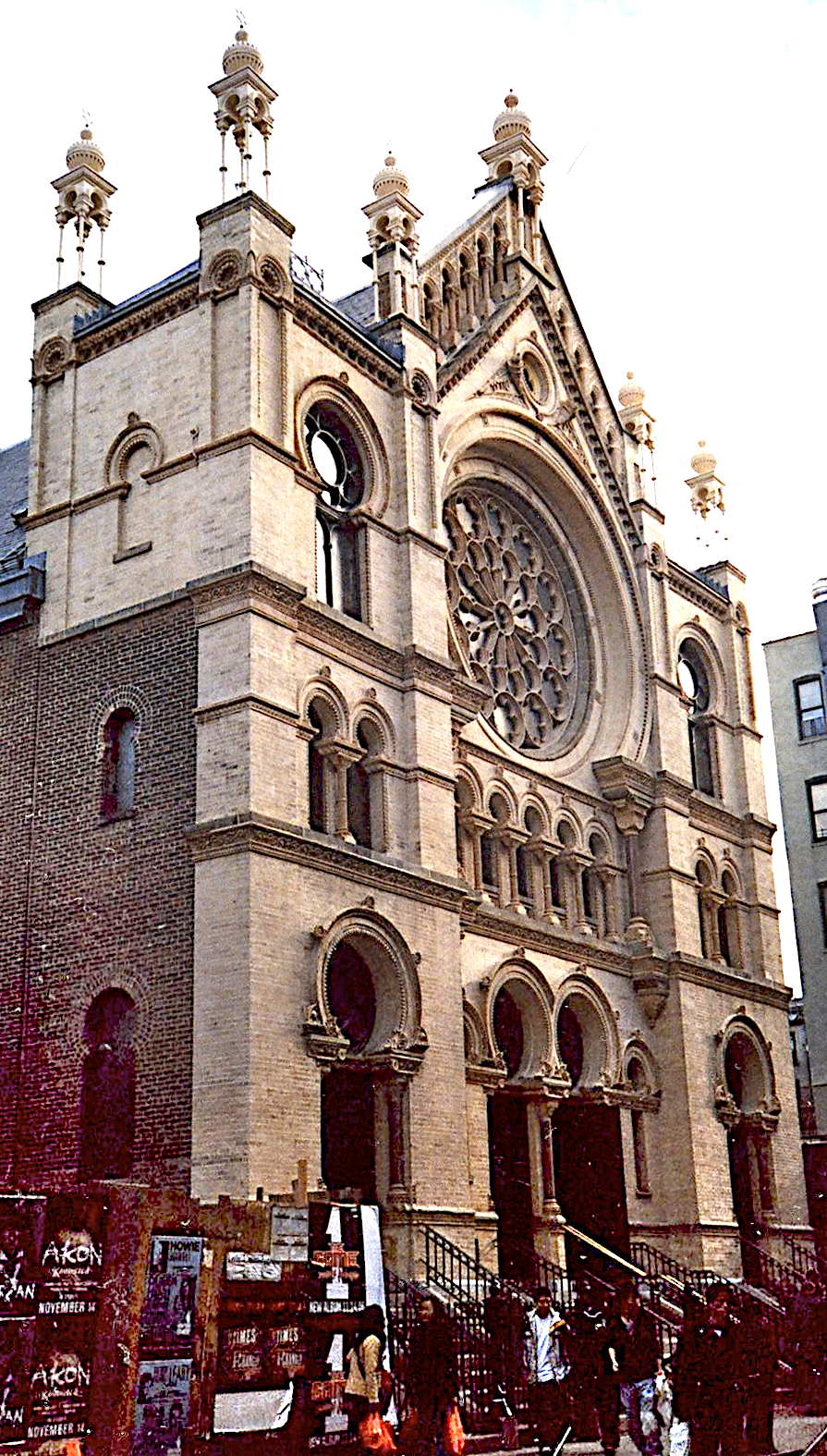
The Eldridge Street Synagogue

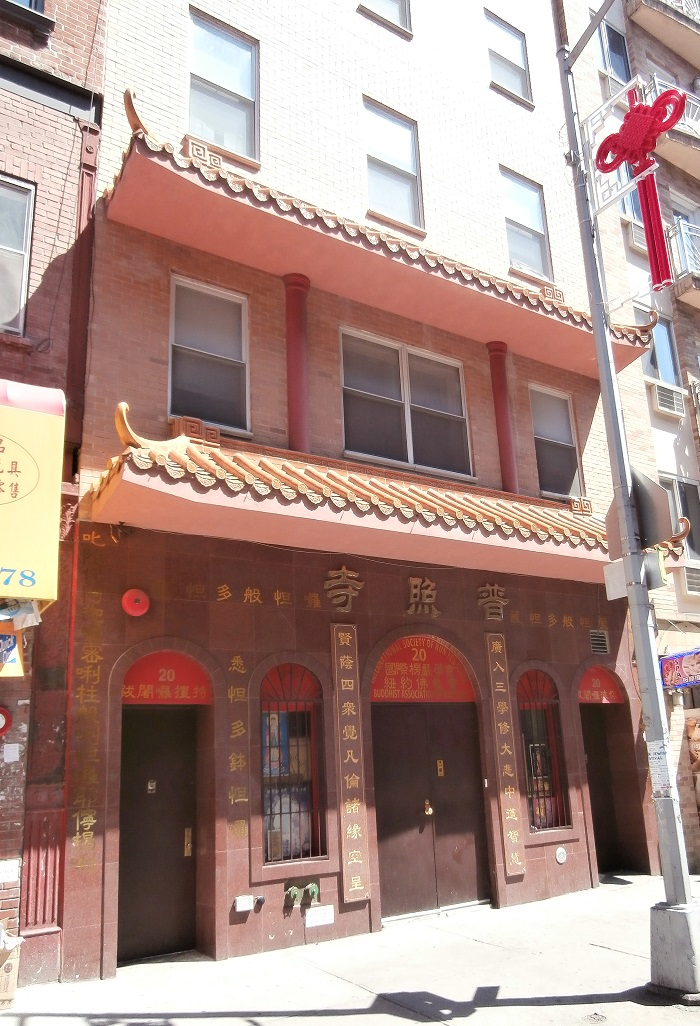
The buddhist temple in 2017

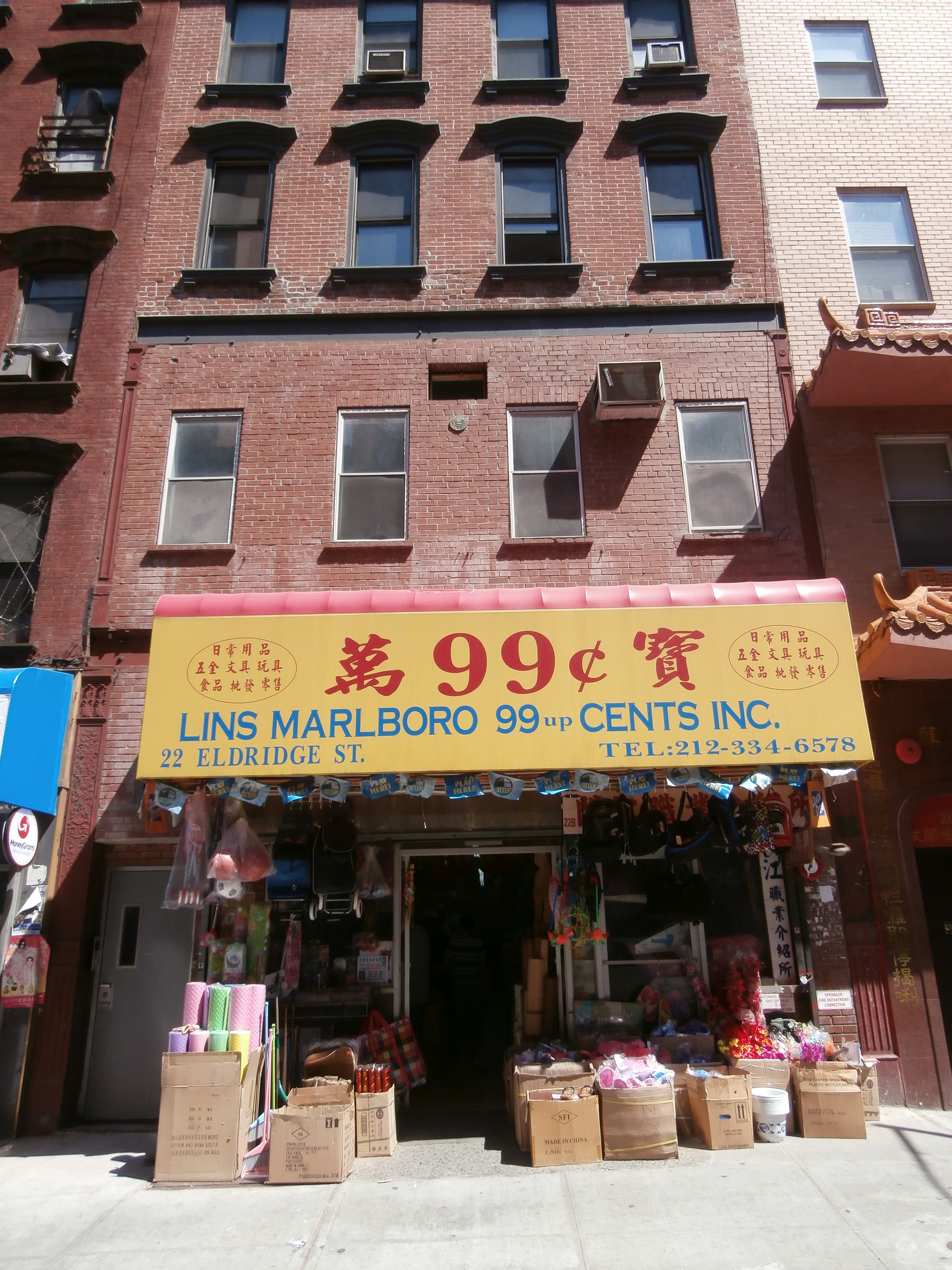
A store with Chinese signage on Eldridge Street

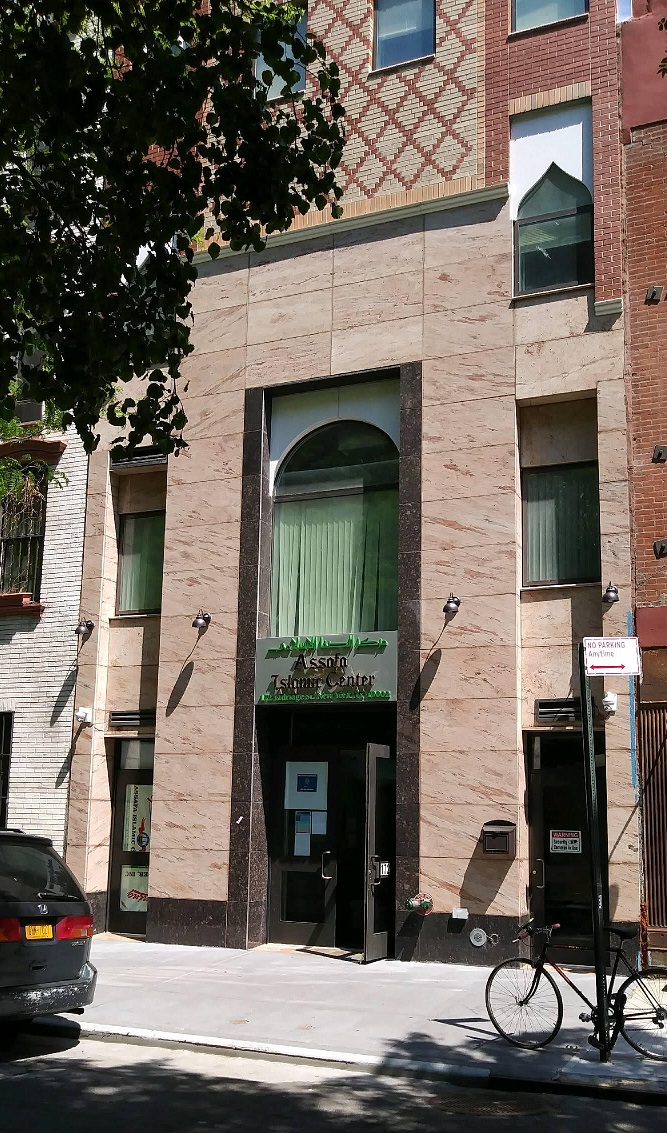
The Assafa Islamic Center, a mosque on Eldridge Street
