= Kozłówka =

Kozłówka may refer to the following places:

- Kozłówka, Lublin Voivodeship (east Poland)
- Kozłówka, Podlaskie Voivodeship (north-east Poland)
- Kozłówka, Masovian Voivodeship (east-central Poland)
