= Rajgród =

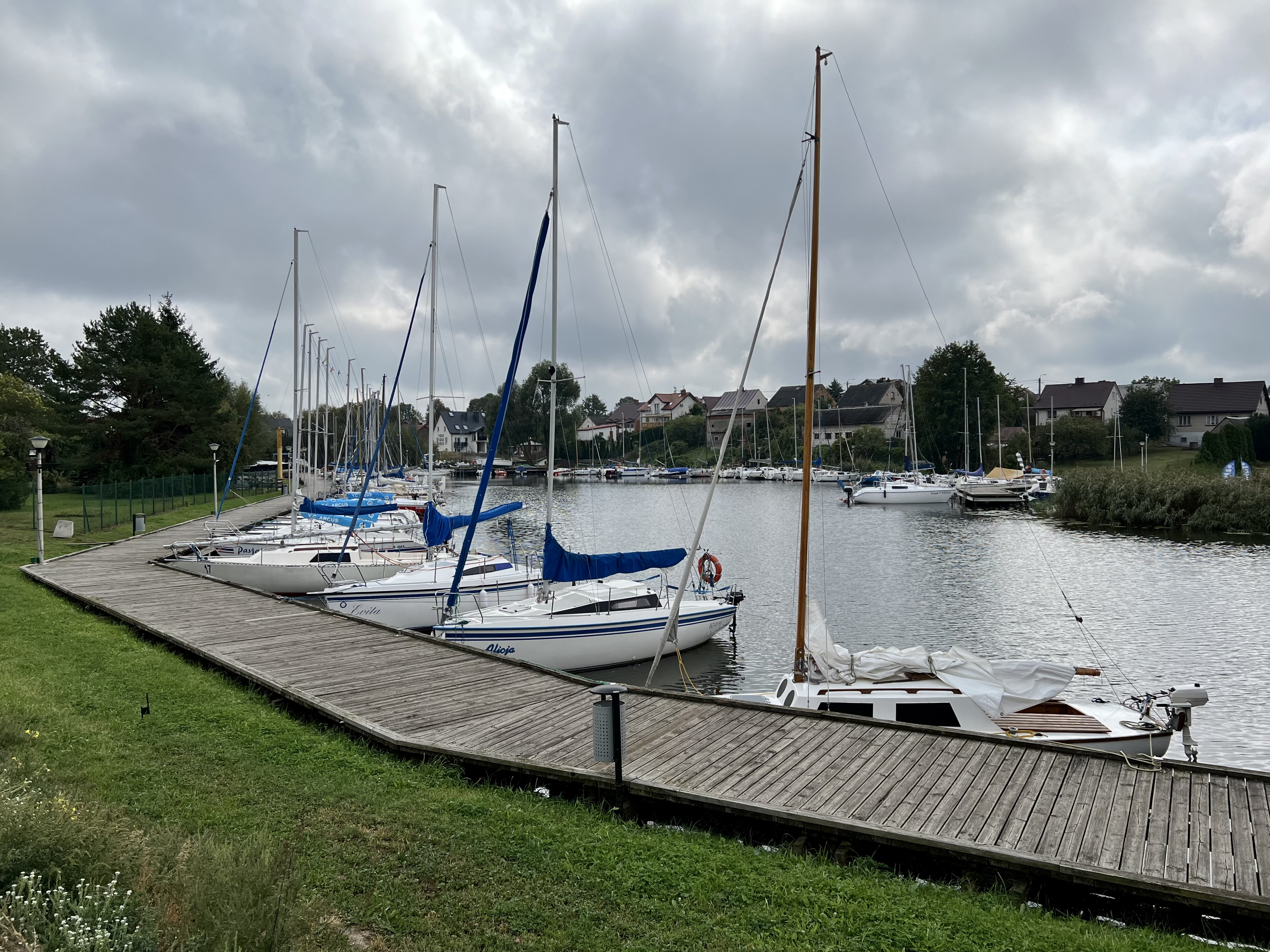

- Coat of arms

- Location within Poland
- Coordinates: 53°43′49″N 22°41′33″E
- Country: Poland
- Voivodeship: Podlaskie
- County: Grajewo
- Gmina: Rajgród
- Town rights: 1568

Area
  - Total: 35.28 km^{2} (13.62 sq mi)

Population (30.06.2016)
  - Total: 1,609
  - Density: 45.61/km^{2} (118.1/sq mi)
- Time zone: UTC+1 (CET)
  - Summer (DST): UTC+2 (CEST)
- Postal code: 19-206
- Area code: +48 86
- License plates: BGR

Rajgród [ˈrai̯ɡrut] is a town in Grajewo County, Podlaskie Voivodeship, in north-eastern Poland, with 1,609 inhabitants (as of June 2016), within the historic region of Podlachia.

== History ==
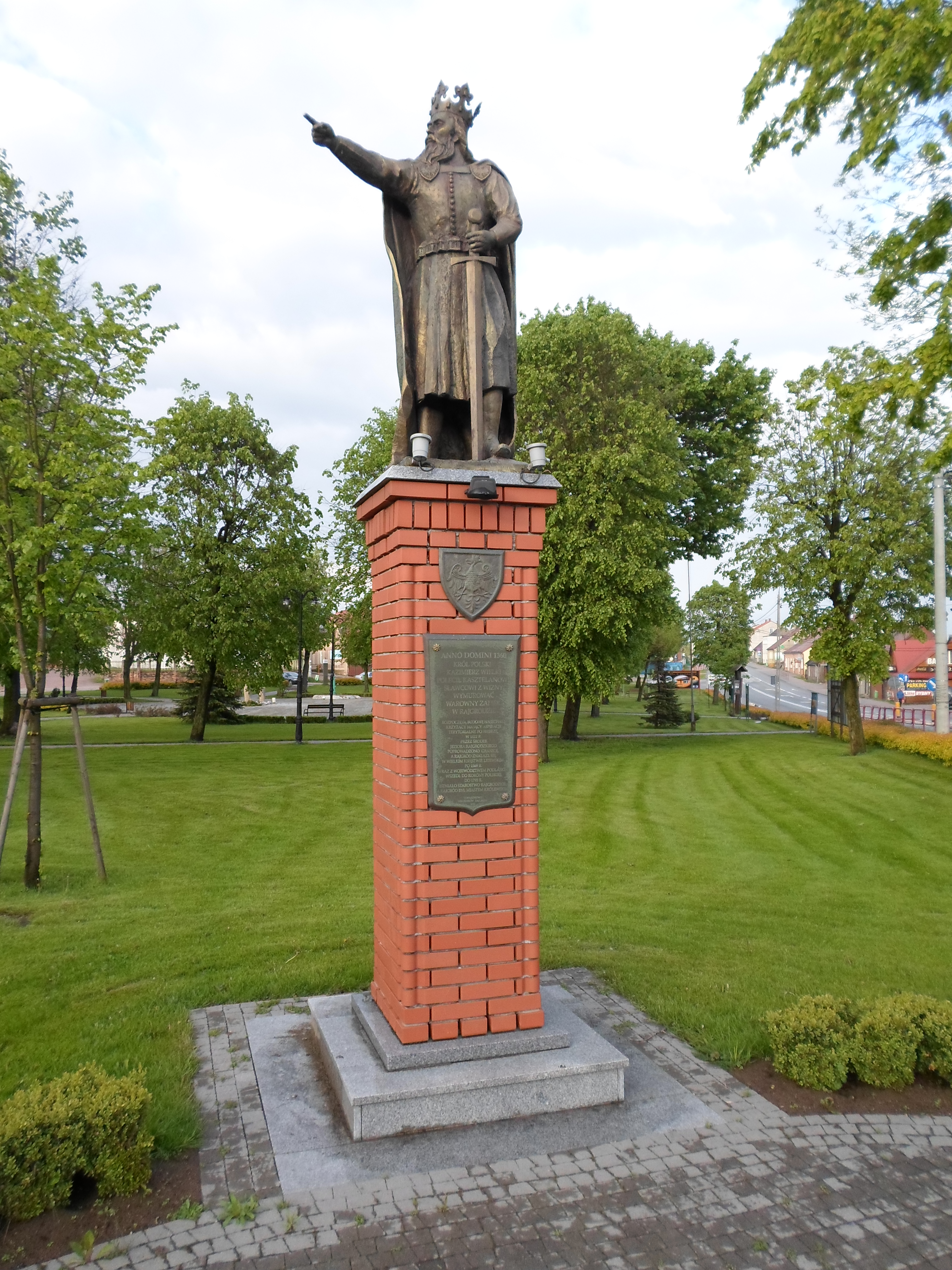
King Casimir III the Great monument in the town center

Rajgród has a long and rich history, with evidence of human habitation dating back to around 9000 BC. In the Middle Ages, the Yotvingians founded a settlement here on a hill. Known as Raj, it would become the Zlincian tribe's main town. According to the chronicler Wigand of Marburg, in 1360 King Casimir III the Great of Poland ordered the castellan of Wizna to build a defensive castle nearby. The fate of the castle has not been established, but it was probably destroyed by the Teutonic Knights.

The first written mention of the town of Rajgród dates from 1429, when a man named Mikołaj of Rajgród sold real estate to his brother Jan. At some time in the early 1440s, a gord (fortified wooden settlement) was established here and Rajgród emerged as a local centre of the timber trade. After the Treaty of Melno, the gord was transferred from Polish Mazovia to the Grand Duchy of Lithuania. In c. 1505 King Alexander I gave Rajgród to a nobleman named Michał Gliński, and in 1509 King Sigismund III of Poland handed the area of Rajgród and Goniądz to Mikołaj Radziwiłł.

In 1568, Rajgród was granted a town charter, and a year later, following the Union of Lublin, it was returned, together with the region of Podlachia, to the Kingdom of Poland. In 1570, Rajgród became a royal town and the seat of a starosta (a senior royal administrative official). The first starosta was Marcin Dulski. In c. 1602, a large manor house was constructed for the local administration. In 1679, King John III Sobieski confirmed Rajgród's privileges and charter, and in 1764, a new church was built.

=== During the partitions ===
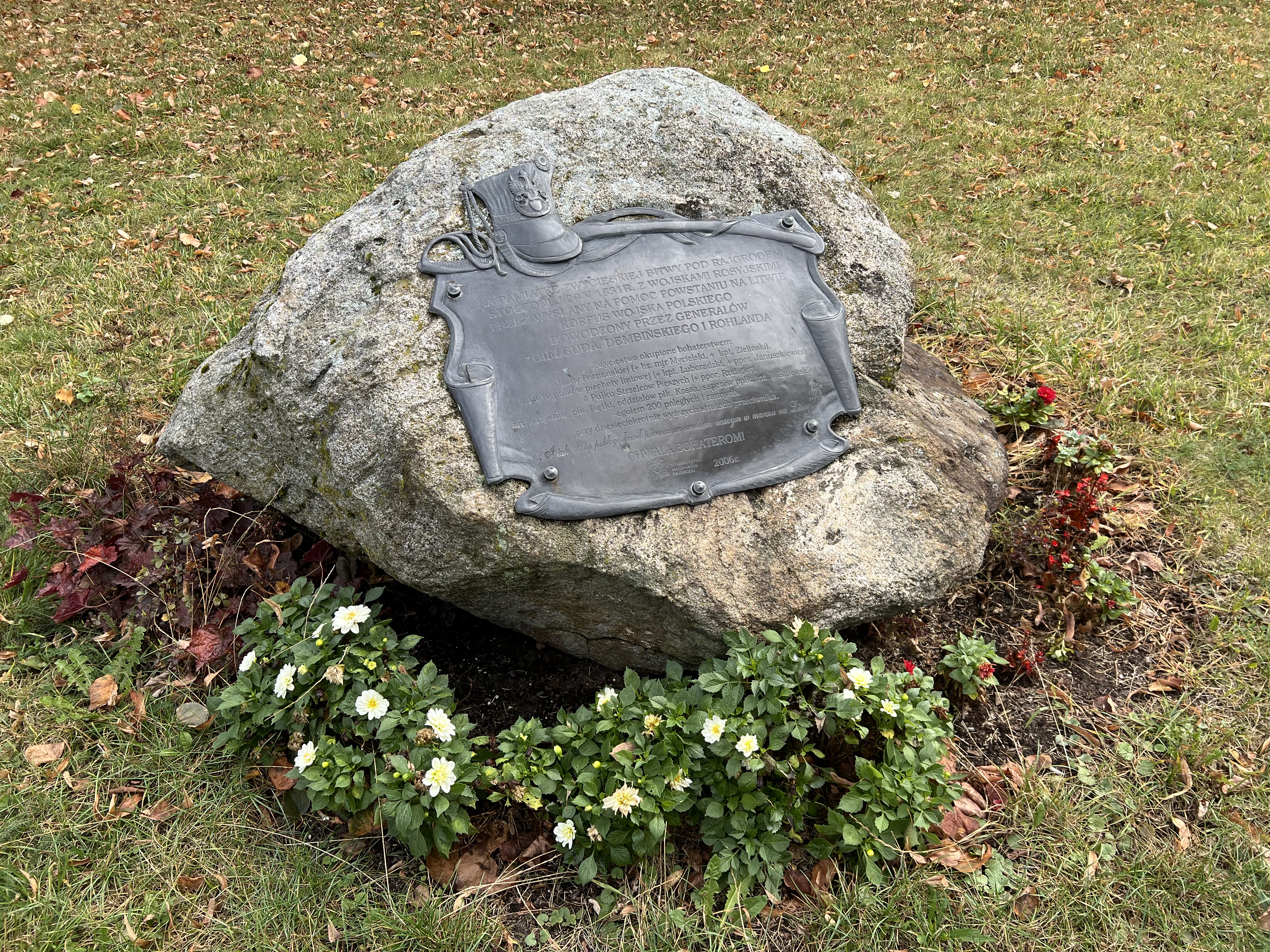
Memorial to the Polish victory in the Battle of Rajgród in 1831

On 10 July 1794, during the Kościuszko Uprising, a party of patriotic nobles and townspeople was defeated here by a detachment of the Prussian Army. After the Third Partition of Poland (1795), the town was annexed by the Kingdom of Prussia, but in 1807 it returned under Polish rule as part of the short-lived Duchy of Warsaw. In 1807, Józef Sienkiewicz, the grandfather of Polish writer and Nobel Prize laureate Henryk Sienkiewicz, became the forester in the Rajgród forestry, and in 1813 the writer's father Józef Paweł Ksawery Sienkiewicz was born in the nearby village of Woźnawieś.

In 1815 it became part of Congress Poland, later on forcibly annexed by the Russian Empire. During the November Uprising, a battle between Polish and Russian forces took place here on 29 May 1831. Rajgród lost its town charter in 1863, as a punishment for its residents’ support of the January Uprising. The town was again part of Poland after the country's independence in 1918. In 1924 the town rights were restored.

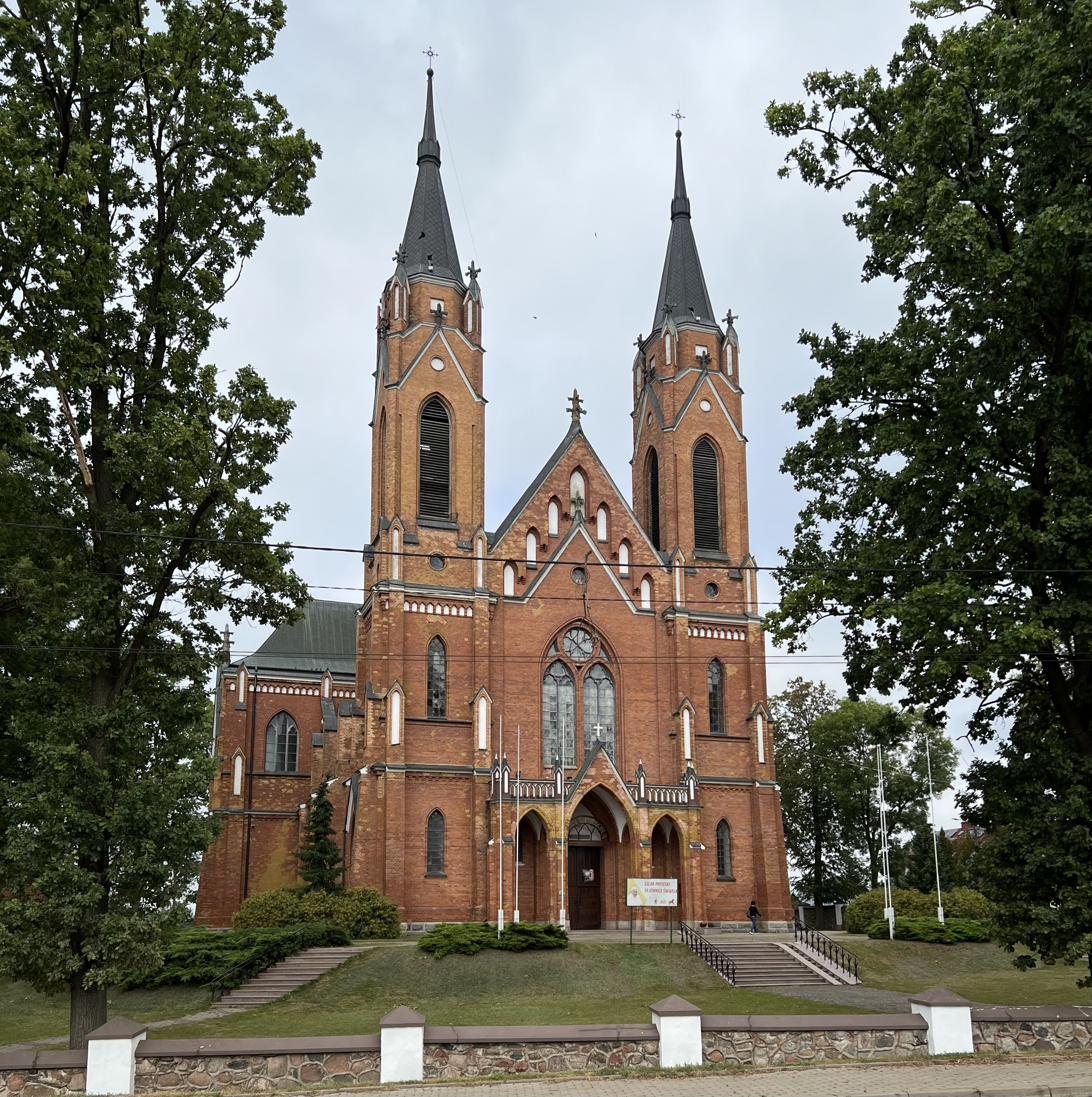
Nativity Church

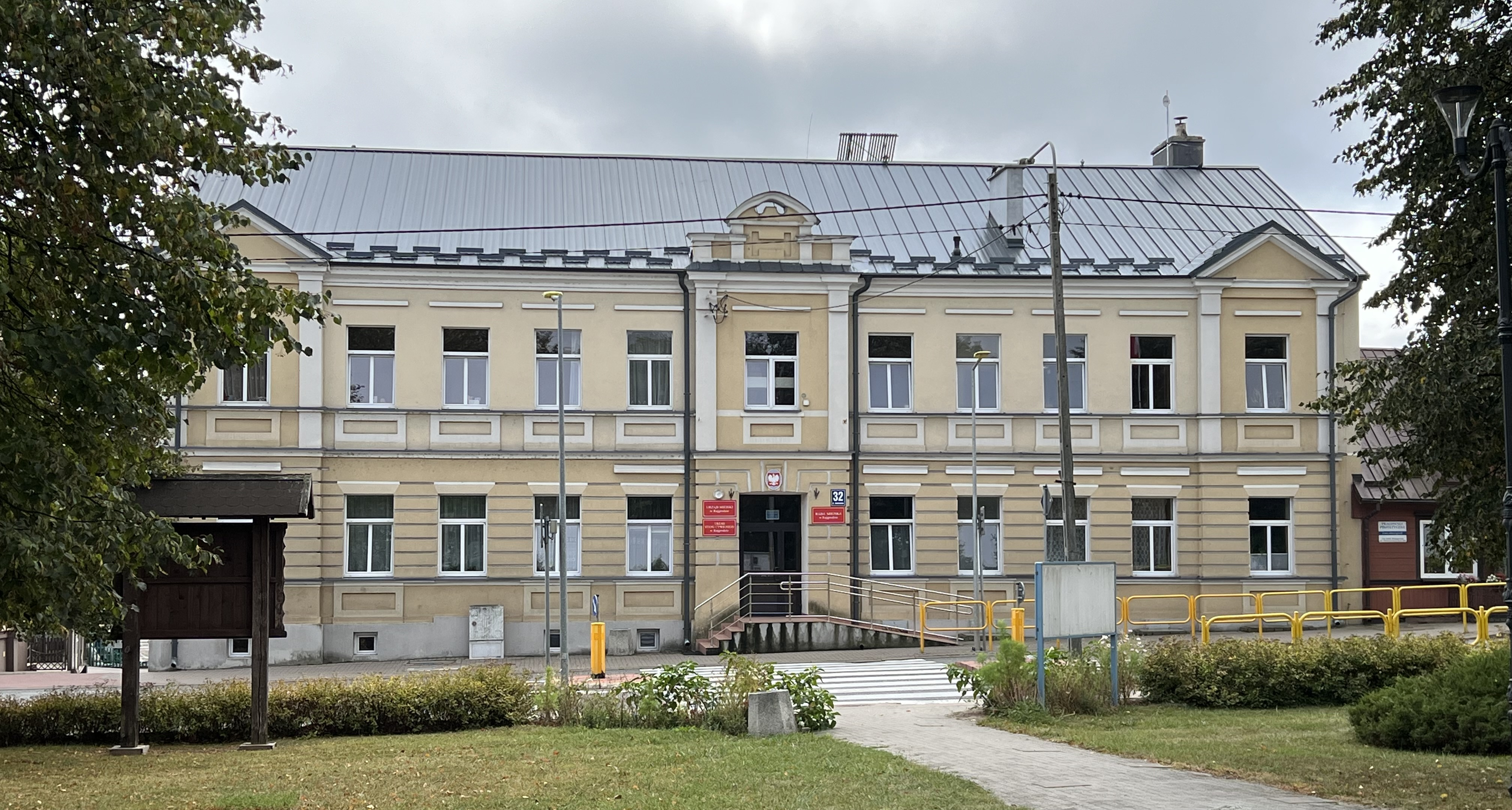
Town Hall

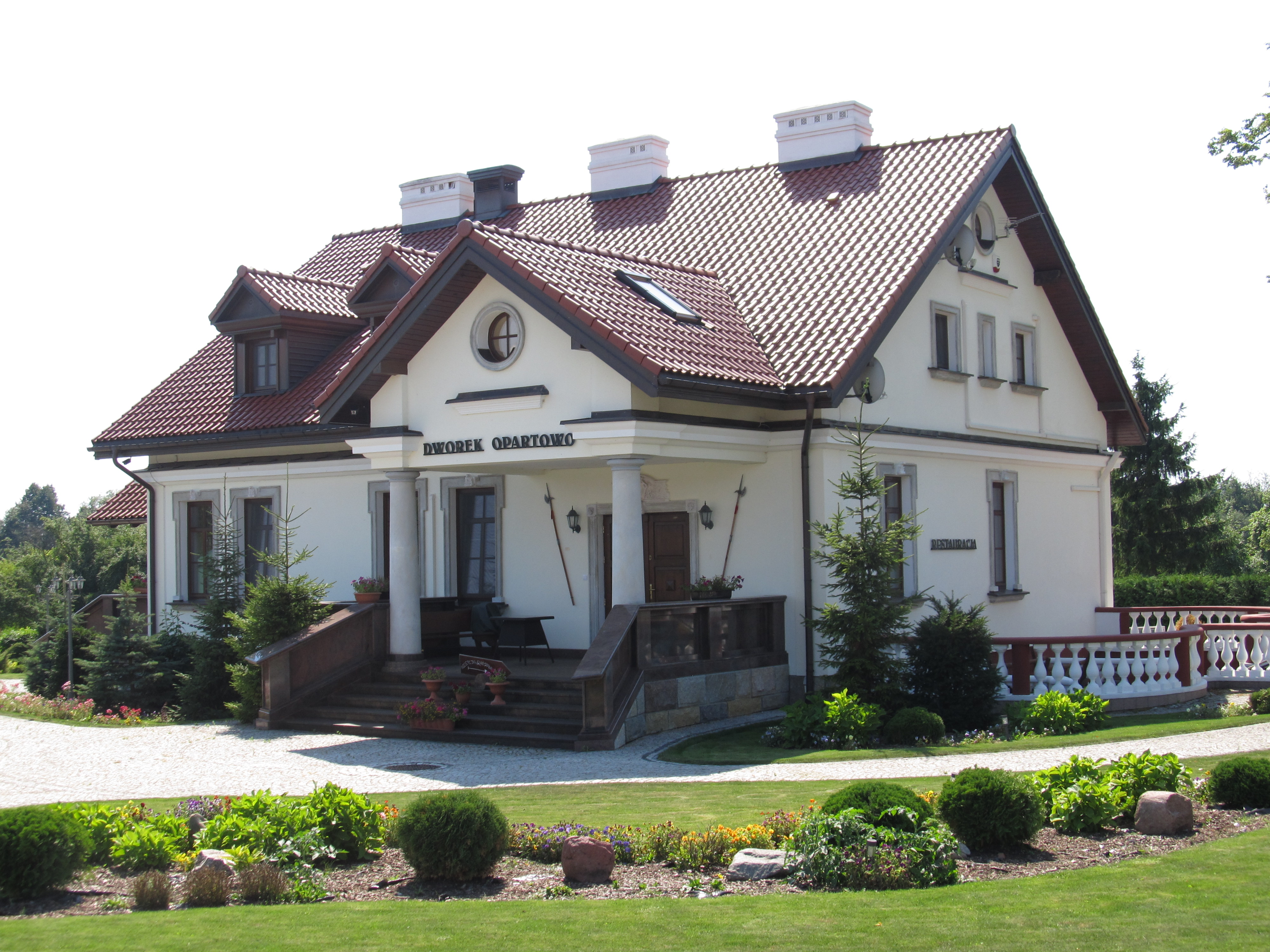
Opartowo Manor

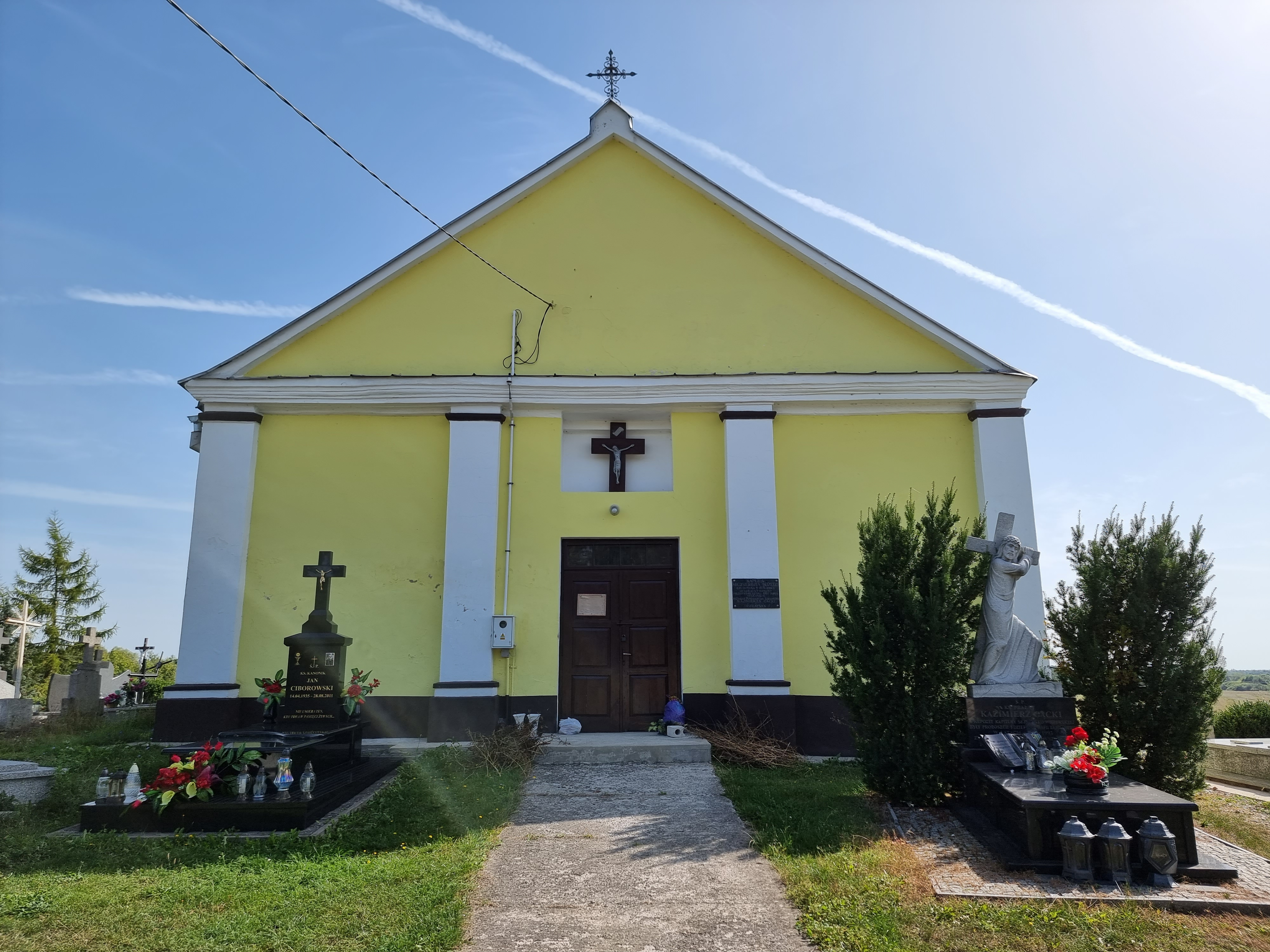
Bagiński Chapel

=== World War II ===
The 1937 population was 2,400 including 600 Jews. The town was initially occupied by the Germans in September 1939, but was then turned over by the Germans to the Soviets. The town was occupied by the Germans during Operation Barbarossa on 22 June 1941, by a Wehrmacht unit passing through. In early July a small SS contingent (2 to 10 men) arrived, and recruited several local Polish collaborators including Antoni Len and Jan Turon. Some 100 Jews who were alleged to have been communist sympathizers (despite this being unlikely for some of the accused, such as a local shop owner) were rounded up by the Poles and forced to sing Russian songs as they were paraded around Rajgród in their underwear, the Poles also beat the marching Jews. Some of the Jews were then re-assembled, marched to the nearby Choinki forest, where at least 30 Jews were shot by the SS and Polish guards.

Len was appointed mayor, and he appointed Turon head of the auxiliary police force formed under German orders. The Polish police plundered Jewish homes and raped Jewish women. Many Jews managed to flee to other towns, including Grajewo, and when two SS officers arrived in late July to oversee the setup of a ghetto they ordered the Polish auxiliaries to find the escapees. The Poles took 20 Jewish women captive and ordered the rabbi of the town to search for the Jews. The rabbi set out to Grajewo personally, but only returned with 20 Jews. Over the next few days Polish auxiliary policeman Adamcewicz, acting on German orders, murdered as many as 50 Jews in Góra Rykowa in two separate actions. The Jews of Rajgród, and surrounding villages, some 550 to 800 souls were concentrated in a crowded ghetto enclosed with barbed wire. On 5 September 1941, on the establishment of German civil administration, the ghetto was turned over to the German Police, and the residents employed in forced labor. German authorities occasionally entered the ghetto to harass and beat Jews to death.

On 25 October 1942 the ghetto was liquidated and the inhabitants sent to the ghetto in Grajewo. On 2 November 1942 the Grajewo was liquidated and most of the Jews were sent to a transit camp in the village of Bogusze. From there they were sent to Treblinka extermination camp and Auschwitz concentration camp and most of them were murdered on arrival.

Local Polish authorities turned in some Jews who remained in hiding around Rajgród. No more than 10 Jews from Rajgród survived the war. After the war, seven Polish collaborators including Len and Torun were tried for war crimes.

During the Soviet and Nazi occupation, the local Polish underground was commanded by lieutenant Andrzej Sobolewski.
