= Tama =

Tama may mean:

== Languages ==
- Tama language, the language of the Sudanese Tama people
- Tama languages, a language family of northern Papua New Guinea
- Tama language, an extinct language of Colombia

== Music ==
- Tama Drums, a Japanese brand manufactured by Hoshino Gakki
- Tama (percussion), a type of talking drum from West Africa
- "Tama", a song by Mory Kanté

== People ==
- La Tama, previously Ocute, a Native American people of the U.S. state of Georgia
- Tama, clan of junior Kazakh Jüz "horde", numbering ca. 70–115,000
- Tama people (Colombia), an indigenous group of Colombia
- Tama people, an ethnic group in Chad and Sudan
- Rumi Tama (珠 瑠美; born 1949), Japanese film director, actress, and screenwriter
- Tama, the ring name of professional wrestler Sam Fatu
- Tama Hochbaum (born 1953), American artist and photographer
- Kiyohara Tama (清原 玉; 1861–1939), Japanese painter
- Tama Kurokawa (1869–1962) the third wife of Sir Edwin Arnold
- Tama Morita (森田 たま; 1894-1970), Japanese essayist
- Tama Nakayama (中山 タマ; 1889–1971), Japanese physician and politician
- Ōnishi Tama (大西 玉; 1916–1969), Japanese religious leader
- Tama Tokuda (1920–2013), Japanese American performer and writer
- Tama Tonga (born 1982), Tongan-American professional wrestler

== Places ==
- Tama, Iowa, United States
- Tama County, Iowa, United States
- Tama, Niger
- Tama, La Rioja, Argentina
- Tama, Musashi (多摩郡), an old district in Musashi Province, Japan
  - Tama Area (多摩地域), the western portion of Tokyo Prefecture
    - Tama Cemetery, the largest municipal cemetery in Japan
    - Tama Hills, an expanse of hills stretching along the southwestern flank of Tokyo
      - Tama New Town, a residential development in the Tama Hills
    - Tama, Tokyo (多摩市), a municipality classified as a city, in western Tokyo
    - Nishitama, Tokyo (西多摩郡), a district in Tokyo
    - Tama River (多摩川), a river in Japan
  - Tama-ku, Kawasaki (多摩区), a ward in Kawasaki, Kanagawa
- Tama River, a tributary of the Koshi River in Nepal
- Tama, Podlaskie Voivodeship (north-east Poland)
- Tama, Świętokrzyskie Voivodeship (south-central Poland)

== Religion ==
- Tama (魂), Shinto term for reverence for elders
- Tama (votive), a votive deposit or ex-voto used in the Eastern Orthodox Churches
- Tama-nui-te-rā, the personification of the Sun in Māori mythology

== Fiction ==
- Kurozumi Tama, fictional character from One Piece
- Tama: Adventurous Ball in Giddy Labyrinth, a Sony PlayStation and Sega Saturn launch game only released in Japan
- Tama, the reactivated form of the android Dark Washu in the manga No Need for Tenchi
- Tama-chan ("full name" Onsen Tamago), a pet turtle character in the manga Love Hina
- Tama (novel), by Winnifred Eaton
- Tama Nekonari, a character from the anime and manga The 100 Girlfriends Who Really, Really, Really, Really, Really Love You
- Tama Sakai, a character from the anime and manga D-Frag
- The Children of Tama, a civilization encountered in the episode Darmok from the television series Star Trek: The Next Generation
- Tama (Tamamohime), a talking fox-like character in the video game World of Final Fantasy
- Tama Yagami, a character from the light novel Sasami-san@Ganbaranai

== Other uses ==
- Tama (cat), a cat who was the stationmaster of a Japanese railway station
- TAMA 300, a gravitational wave detector
- Tama Home, a Japanese housing company
- Tama Art University, a Japanese private art school
- Tama edwardsi, a species of spiders
- Tama Toshi Monorail Line (多摩都市モノレール線), in Tokyo, Japan
- Tama Electric Car Company, a car manufacturer which became Prince Motor Company
- Tama-chan, an Arctic seal living in the Tokyo area which became a national celebrity in 2002
- 1089 Tama (多摩), an asteroid
- Armenian draughts
- Japanese cruiser Tama, a Japanese light cruiser during World War II
- Thymoma-associated multiorgan autoimmunity
- A wooden spool for making kumihimo braids with a Marudai
- An abbreviation of the name of the virtual pet Tamagotchi by Bandai
- An abbreviation for National Outline Plan

== See also ==
- Tamas (disambiguation)
- Thama the Elephant, a fictional character and a series of children's books by Indian writer Kamala Laxman
- Tamma Srinivasa Reddy (born 1968), Indian photographer
- "Tamma Tamma", a song by Bappi Lahiri and Anuradha Paudwal from the 1990 Indian film Thanedaar, based on "Tama" by Mory Kante
- w:ja:タマ
- w:ja:玉
- w:ja:多摩
