= Gmina Rajgród =

Gmina Rajgród Rajgród Commune
- Gmina
- Coat of arms

- Gmina Rajgród within the Grajewo County
- Coordinates (Rajgród): 53°43′49″N 22°41′33″E
- Country: Poland
- Voivodeship: Podlaskie
- County: Grajewo
- Seat: Rajgród

Area
  - Total: 207.16 km^{2} (79.98 sq mi)

Population (2011)
  - Total: 5,487
  - Density: 26.49/km^{2} (68.60/sq mi)
  - Urban: 1,669
  - Rural: 3,818

Gmina Rajgród is an urban-rural gmina (administrative district) in Grajewo County, Podlaskie Voivodeship, in north-eastern Poland. Its seat is the town of Rajgród, which lies approximately 19 kilometres (12 mi) north-east of Grajewo and 75 km (47 mi) north-west of the regional capital Białystok.

The gmina covers an area of 207.16 square kilometres (80.0 sq mi), and as of 2006 its total population is 5,539 (out of which the population of Rajgród amounts to 1,673, and the population of the rural part of the gmina is 3,866).

== Villages ==
Apart from the town of Rajgród, Gmina Rajgród contains the villages and settlements of Bełda, Biebrza, Budy, Bukowo, Ciszewo, Czarna Wieś, Danowo, Karczewo, Karwowo, Kołaki, Kosiły, Kosówka, Kozłówka, Kuligi, Łazarze, Miecze, Orzechówka, Pieńczykówek, Pieńczykowo, Pikły, Przejma, Przestrzele, Rybczyzna, Rydzewo, Skrodzkie, Sołki, Stoczek, Tama, Turczyn, Wojdy, Wólka Mała, Wólka Piotrowska, Woźnawieś and Wykowo.

== Neighbouring gminas ==
Gmina Rajgród is bordered by the gminas of Bargłów Kościelny, Goniądz, Grajewo, Kalinowo and Prostki.
