= Karnowski =

Karnowski (Polish pronunciation: [karˈnɔfskʲi]; feminine: Karnowka; plural: Karnowscy) is a Polish-language surname. It may refer to:

- Jan Karnowski (1886–1939), Polish judge and poet
- Przemek Karnowski (born 1993), Polish basketball player

== See also ==
- Karwowski
