= Bernice Kolko =

Polish-American photographer (1905–1970)

- Kolko in 1964
- Born: 1905; Grajewo, Podlaskie Voivodeship, Poland
- Died: 1970 (aged 64–65)
- Occupation: Photographer

Bernice Kolko (1905–1970) was a Polish-American photographer.

== Early life ==
She was born in 1905 in Grajewo, Poland. After the death of her father, Kolko's mother moved the family to the United States.

== Career ==
During World War II, she joined the Women's Army Corps as a photographer.

In 1953 she became friends with Diego Rivera and Frida Kahlo, who she had met when they visited Chicago. They invited her to Mexico, where she travelled taking pictures of the women of Mexico. She and Kahlo travelled frequently, with Kolko taking photos of Kahlo in the two years before Kahlo's death.

In 1955 she became the first woman to exhibit at the Palacio de Bellas Artes.

Her work is included in the collections of the High Museum of Art, and the Museum of Fine Arts, Houston,
