= Wykowo =

Wykowo may refer to the following places:

- Wykowo, Masovian Voivodeship (east-central Poland)
- Wykowo, Grajewo County in Podlaskie Voivodeship (north-east Poland)
- Wykowo, Kolno County in Podlaskie Voivodeship (north-east Poland)
