= Pieńczykowo =

- Village
- Location within Poland
- Coordinates: 53°38′N 22°37′E
- Country: Poland
- Voivodeship: Podlaskie
- County: Grajewo
- Gmina: Rajgród

Pieńczykowo [pjɛɲt͡ʂɨˈkɔvɔ] is a village in the administrative district of Gmina Rajgród, within Grajewo County, Podlaskie Voivodeship, in north-eastern Poland.
