= Skrodzkie =

- Village
- Location within Poland
- Coordinates: 53°43′N 22°37′E
- Country: Poland
- Voivodeship: Podlaskie
- County: Grajewo
- Gmina: Rajgród
- Postal code: 19-206
- Vehicle registration: BGR

Skrodzkie [ˈskrɔt͡skʲɛ] is a village in the administrative district of Gmina Rajgród, within Grajewo County, Podlaskie Voivodeship, in north-eastern Poland.

Four Polish citizens were murdered by Nazi Germany in the village during World War II.
