= Kuligi, Podlaskie Voivodeship =

Kuligi
- Village
- Location within Poland
- Coordinates: 53°38′N 22°44′E
- Country: Poland
- Voivodeship: Podlaskie
- County: Grajewo
- Gmina: Rajgród
- Postal code: 19-206
- Vehicle registration: BGR

Kuligi [kuˈliɡi] is a village in the administrative district of Gmina Rajgród, within Grajewo County, Podlaskie Voivodeship, in north-eastern Poland.

Five Polish citizens were murdered by Nazi Germany in the village during World War II.
