= Kosówka, Podlaskie Voivodeship =

Kosówka
- Village
- Location within Poland
- Coordinates: 53°41′N 22°31′E
- Country: Poland
- Voivodeship: Podlaskie
- County: Grajewo
- Gmina: Rajgród
- Time zone: UTC+1 (CET)
  - Summer (DST): UTC+2 (CEST)
- Area code: +48 86
- Car plates: BGR

Kosówka [kɔˈsufka] is a village in the administrative district of Gmina Rajgród, within Grajewo County, Podlaskie Voivodeship, in north-eastern Poland. It is located within the historic region of Podlachia.

== History ==
It is a former royal village of the Polish Crown.

During the German occupation of Poland during World War II, on July 15, 1943, in the Kosówka forest, the German gendarmerie in cooperation with the Gestapo murdered about 150 Poles, most of them inhabitants of the nearby town of Grajewo. On January 20, 1945, the Germans committed another murder in the Kosówka forest, killing 300 Poles. A memorial dedicated to the victims was erected in Kosówka in 1959.
