= Miecze =

- Village
- Location within Poland
- Coordinates: 53°40′17″N 22°33′56″E
- Country: Poland
- Voivodeship: Podlaskie
- County: Grajewo
- Gmina: Rajgród
- Population (approx.): 200

Miecze [ˈmjɛt͡ʂɛ] is a village in the administrative district of Gmina Rajgród, within Grajewo County, Podlaskie Voivodeship, in north-eastern Poland.
