= Budy, Grajewo County =

Budy
- Village
- Location within Poland
- Coordinates: 53°41′46″N 22°42′40″E
- Country: Poland
- Voivodeship: Podlaskie
- County: Grajewo
- Gmina: Rajgród
- Population: 90

Budy [ˈbudɨ] is a village in the administrative district of Gmina Rajgród, within Grajewo County, Podlaskie Voivodeship, in north-eastern Poland.
