= Pikły =

- Settlement
- Location within Poland
- Coordinates: 53°41′46″N 22°38′34″E
- Country: Poland
- Voivodeship: Podlaskie
- County: Grajewo
- Gmina: Rajgród

Pikły [ˈpikwɨ] is a settlement in the administrative district of Gmina Rajgród, within Grajewo County, Podlaskie Voivodeship, in north-eastern Poland.
