= Karwowo =

Karwowo may refer to the following places:

- Karwowo, Gmina Radziłów in Podlaskie Voivodeship (north-east Poland)
- Karwowo, Gmina Rajgród in Podlaskie Voivodeship (north-east Poland)
- Karwowo, Kolno County in Podlaskie Voivodeship (north-east Poland)
- Karwowo, Masovian Voivodeship (east-central Poland)
- Karwowo, Łobez County in West Pomeranian Voivodeship (north-west Poland)
- Karwowo, Police County in West Pomeranian Voivodeship (north-west Poland)
