= Rybczyzna =

- Village
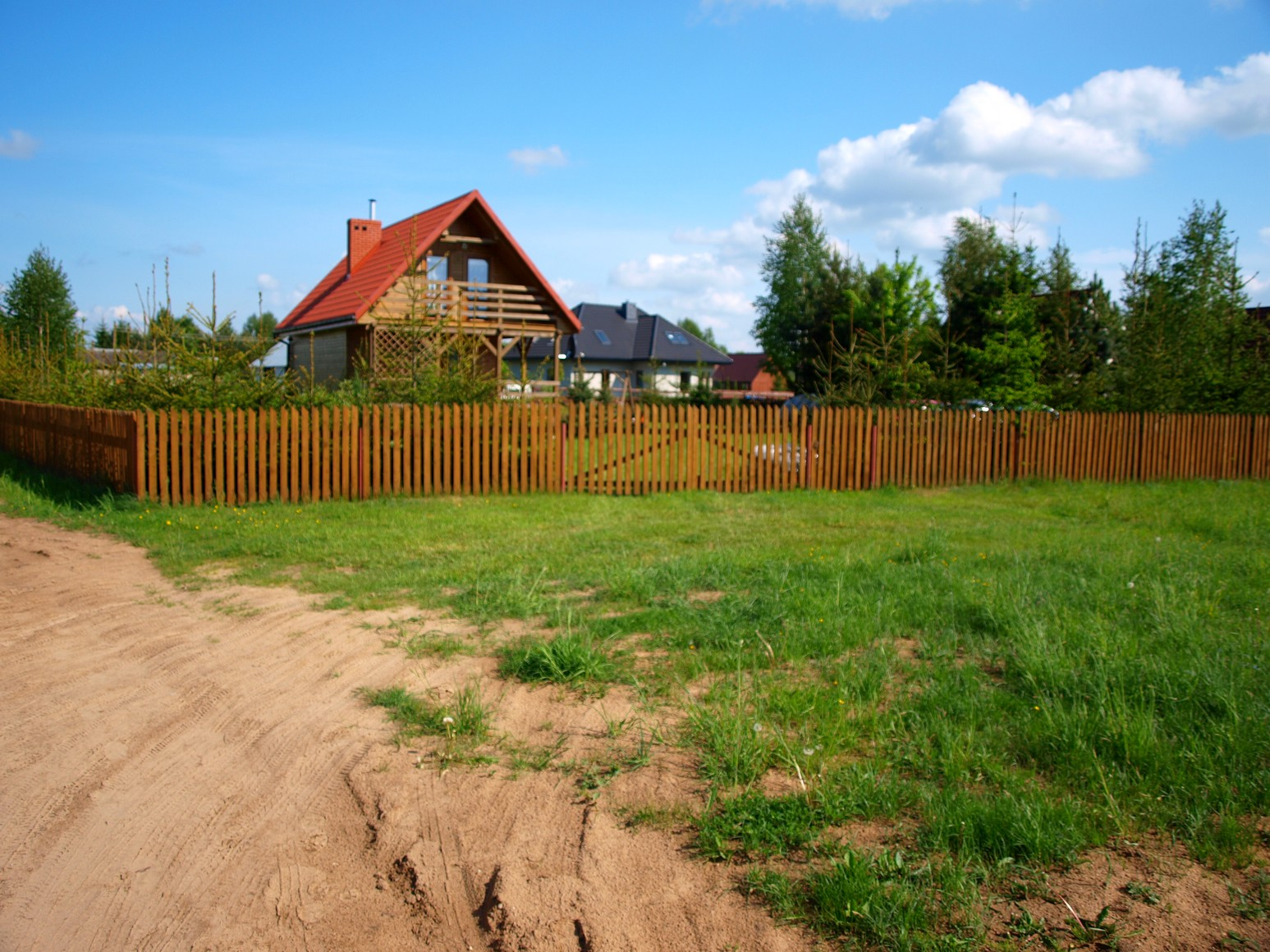

- Location within Poland
- Coordinates: 53°41′46″N 22°42′40″E
- Country: Poland
- Voivodeship: Podlaskie
- County: Grajewo
- Gmina: Rajgród

Rybczyzna [rɨpˈt͡ʂɨzna] is a village in the administrative district of Gmina Rajgród, within Grajewo County, Podlaskie Voivodeship, in north-eastern Poland.
