= Sender Jarmulowsky =

Russian Jewish banker (1840–1912)

- Born: 1840; Grajewo, Russian Empire (present-day Poland)
- Died: 1912 (aged 71–72); New York City, U.S.
- Other name: Alexander Jarmulowsky
- Occupations: Banker, rabbi
- Known for: Founding Jarmulowsky Bank and helping the Jewish immigrant community access financial services

Alexander Jarmulowsky (1840–1912), better known as Sender Jarmulowsky, was a Russian Jewish banker who founded the Jarmulowsky Bank on the Lower East Side of New York in 1873.

== Life ==
Jarmulowsky was born in the town of Grajewo, Russia (present-day Poland), in 1840 to Moszko Jarmulowsky and Fejga Zeligson. He was orphaned at a young age and then raised by the Rabbi of Werblow. He later attended the Volozhin Yeshiva and was ordained as a rabbi.

Jarmulowsky moved to Hamburg in 1868 and started a shipping business selling ship tickets. He moved to New York City in 1873, where he opened his own bank at Canal and Mott Street. Located on the Lower East Side, Jarmulowsky's bank advertised itself to newly arrived immigrants (primarily Eastern European Jews) who were ignored by larger banking institutions in the city. As well as providing bank accounts and loans, Jarmulowsky's bank built on his business background in Hamburg by allowing immigrants to purchase steamship tickets for their relatives back in Europe.

In addition to his business activities, Jarmulowsky also served as the first president of the Eldridge Street Synagogue, during which he helped raise the money to construct its 1887 building. He served as one of the twenty-five members of the New York Kehillah (Jewish Community) executive board, representing the interests of Eastern European Jews.

Jarmulowsky's bank was successful enough that he was able to construct a new bank building (the Jarmulowsky Bank Building) in 1912. Although his business and clients were based on the Lower East Side, Jarmulowsky moved uptown in 1889 to East 60th Street, and later moved to 16 East 93rd Street on the Upper East Side, living near the Felix Warburg mansion (present day site of the Jewish Museum).

== Legacy ==
In his memoirs, Louis Lipsky testified to the high regard for Jarmulowsky among Eastern European Jews in New York, writing that "so far as [Jarmulowsky's] immortality is concerned, he remains in the memory of thousands of American Jews as the man who freed them on the soil of the United States".

After Jarmulowsky's death in 1912, he left an estate valued around $500,000, a lower sum than had been assumed. The Bank was entrusted to his sons Meyer and Louis Jarmulowsky. During World War I, in 1917, customers attempted to withdraw money to send overseas to their relatives. The bank lacked the necessary funds, since its finances had been invested in Harlem real estate. (As part of his real estate investments, Meyer had funded the construction of Harlem's Lafayette Theater in 1912). After an ensuing riot, Meyer and Louis were indicted for banking fraud and the Jarmulowsky Bank was closed.
