= Czarna Wieś, Podlaskie Voivodeship =

Czarna Wieś
- Village
- Location within Poland
- Coordinates: 53°42′35″N 22°38′51″E
- Country: Poland
- Voivodeship: Podlaskie
- County: Grajewo
- Gmina: Rajgród
- Population: 180

Czarna Wieś [ˈt͡ʂarna ˈvjɛɕ] is a village in the administrative district of Gmina Rajgród, within Grajewo County, Podlaskie Voivodeship, in north-eastern Poland.
