= Tamas =

Tamas may refer to:

- Tamas (philosophy), a concept of darkness and death in Hindu philosophy
- Tamás (name), a given name in Hungarian (Thomas)
- Tamas (novel), a 1975 novel about the partition of India by Bhisham Sahni
  - Tamas (film), a 1987 TV series and film adaptation by Govind Nihalani
- Christian Tămaș, Romanian writer
- Gabriel Tamaș (born 1983), Romanian footballer
- Vladimir Tămaș, Romanian footballer

== See also ==
- Tama (disambiguation)
