= Biebrza, Podlaskie Voivodeship =

Biebrza
- Village
- Location within Poland
- Coordinates: 53°38′53″N 22°34′34″E
- Country: Poland
- Voivodeship: Podlaskie
- County: Grajewo
- Gmina: Rajgród

Biebrza [ˈbjɛbʐa] is a village in the administrative district of Gmina Rajgród, within Grajewo County, Podlaskie Voivodeship, in north-eastern Poland.
