= Orzechówka, Podlaskie Voivodeship =

Orzechówka
- Village
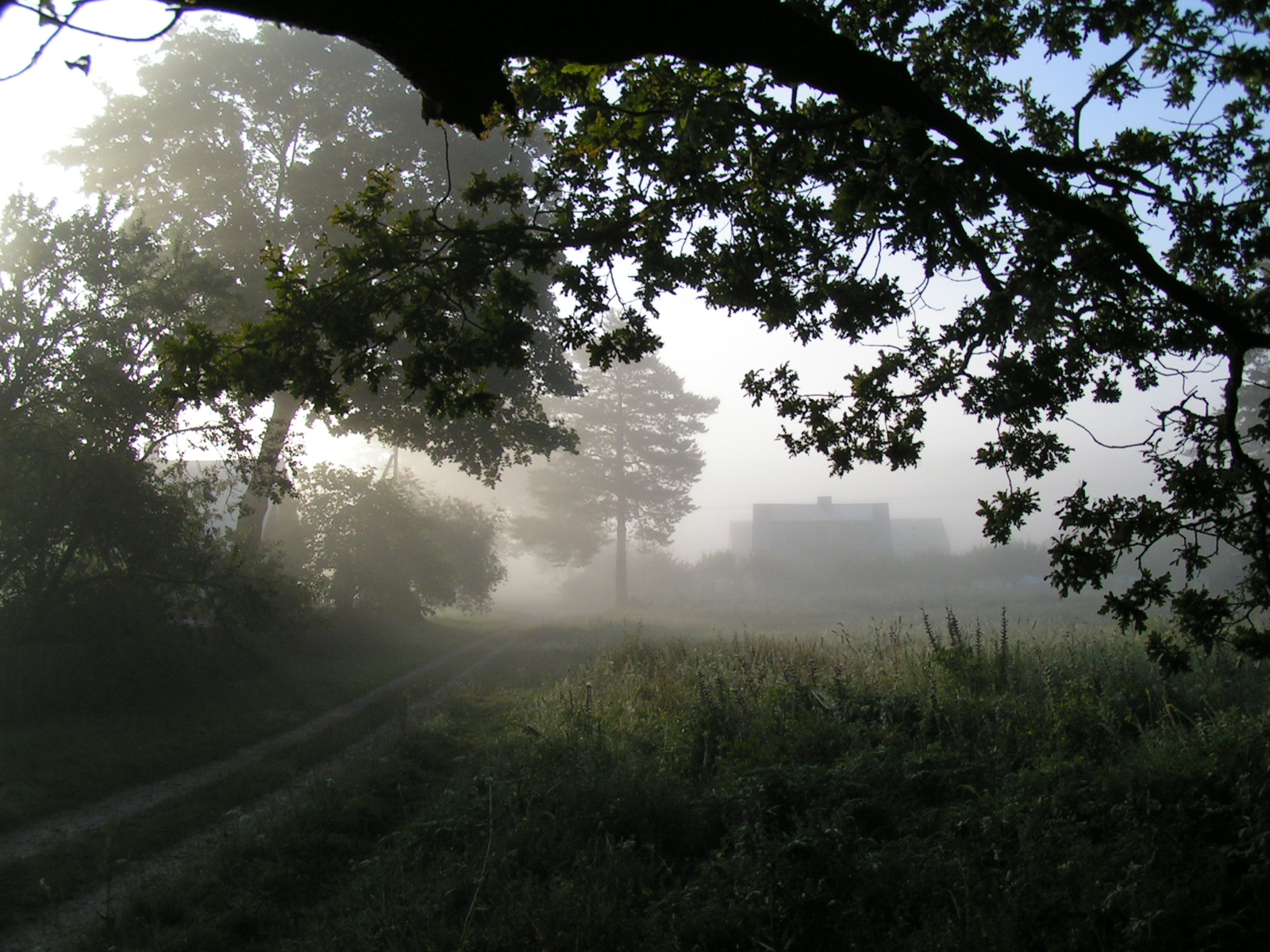
- Orzechowka village, foggy morning on the outskirts of the Biebrza National Park

- Location within Poland
- Coordinates: 53°40′43″N 22°50′28″E
- Country: Poland
- Voivodeship: Podlaskie
- County: Grajewo
- Gmina: Rajgród

Orzechówka [ɔʐɛˈxufka] is a village in the administrative district of Gmina Rajgród, within Grajewo County, Podlaskie Voivodeship, in north-eastern Poland.
