= Wólka Mała, Grajewo County =

Wólka Mała
- Village
- Location within Poland
- Coordinates: 53°40′01″N 22°46′01″E
- Country: Poland
- Voivodeship: Podlaskie
- County: Grajewo
- Gmina: Rajgród

Wólka Mała [ˈvulka ˈmawa] is a village in the administrative district of Gmina Rajgród, within Grajewo County, Podlaskie Voivodeship, in north-eastern Poland.
