= Wojdy =

- Village
- Location within Poland
- Coordinates: 53°44′N 22°42′E
- Country: Poland
- Voivodeship: Podlaskie
- County: Grajewo
- Gmina: Rajgród

Wojdy [ˈvɔi̯dɨ] is a village in the administrative district of Gmina Rajgród, within Grajewo County, Podlaskie Voivodeship, in north-eastern Poland.
