= Kosiły, Podlaskie Voivodeship =

Kosiły
- Village
- Location within Poland
- Coordinates: 53°43′N 22°38′E
- Country: Poland
- Voivodeship: Podlaskie
- County: Grajewo
- Gmina: Rajgród

Kosiły [kɔˈɕiwɨ] is a village in the administrative district of Gmina Rajgród, within Grajewo County, Podlaskie Voivodeship, in north-eastern Poland.
