= Sołki, Podlaskie Voivodeship =

Sołki
- Village
- Location within Poland
- Coordinates: 53°37′14″N 22°36′39″E
- Country: Poland
- Voivodeship: Podlaskie
- County: Grajewo
- Gmina: Rajgród
- Population: 81

Sołki [ˈsɔu̯ki] is a village in the administrative district of Gmina Rajgród, within Grajewo County, Podlaskie Voivodeship, in north-eastern Poland.
