= Przejma, Podlaskie Voivodeship =

Przejma
- Village
- Location within Poland
- Coordinates: 53°41′47″N 22°38′35″E
- Country: Poland
- Voivodeship: Podlaskie
- County: Grajewo
- Gmina: Rajgród

Przejma [ˈpʂɛi̯ma] is a village in the administrative district of Gmina Rajgród, within Grajewo County, Podlaskie Voivodeship, in north-eastern Poland.
