= Rydzewo, Grajewo County =

Rydzewo
- Village
- Location within Poland
- Coordinates: 53°41′59″N 22°32′7″E
- Country: Poland
- Voivodeship: Podlaskie
- County: Grajewo
- Gmina: Rajgród

Rydzewo [rɨˈd͡zɛvɔ] is a village in the administrative district of Gmina Rajgród, within Grajewo County, Podlaskie Voivodeship, in north-eastern Poland.
