= Jarmulowsky Bank Building =

Building in Manhattan, New York

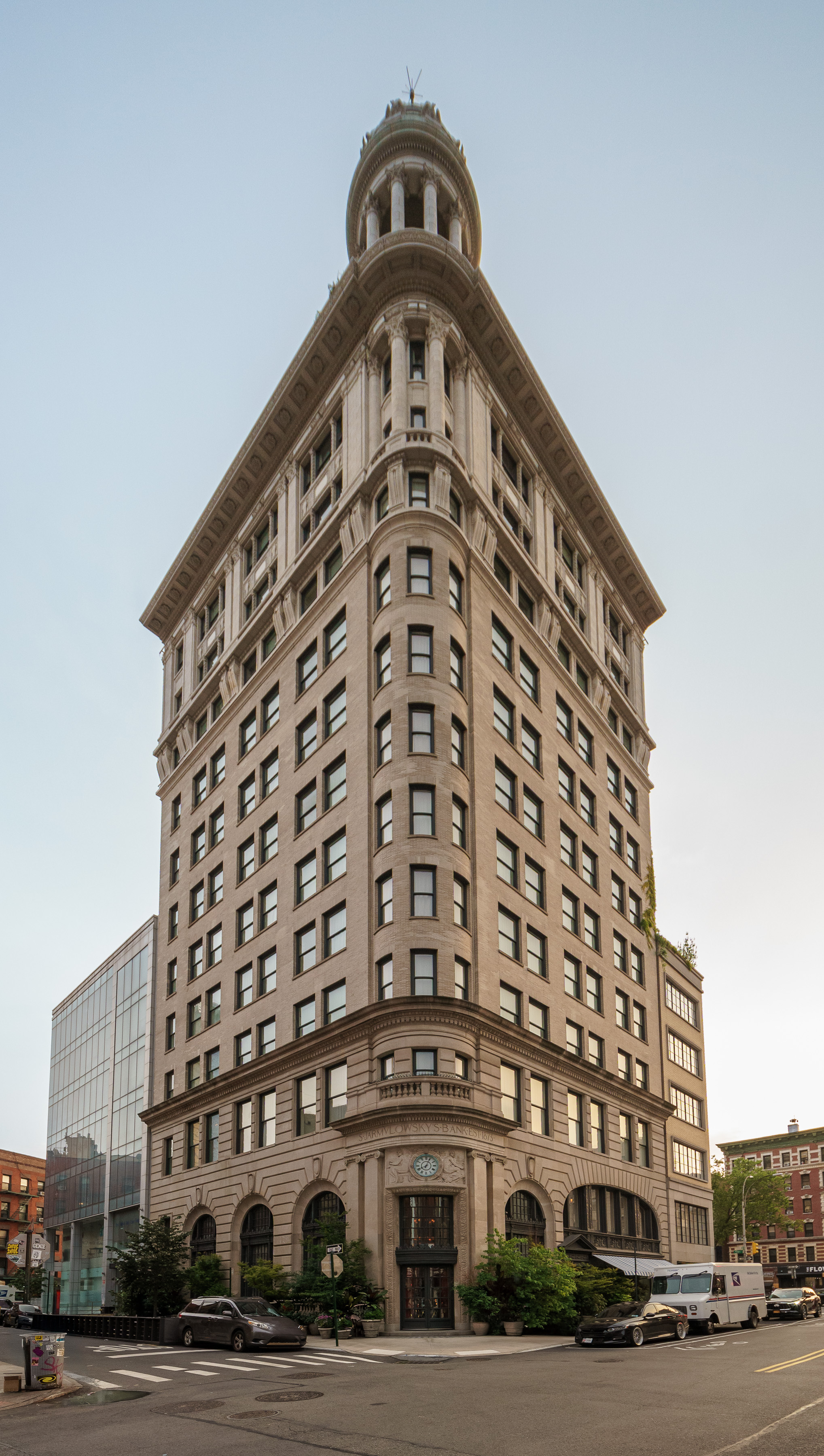
- Interactive map of the Jarmulowsky Bank Building area

General information
- Architectural style: Beaux-Arts architecture
- Location: 54-58 Canal Street, 5-9 Orchard Street, Lower East Side, Manhattan, New York City, New York, 10002, United States
- Coordinates: 40°42′53″N 73°59′32″W
- Completed: 1912

Height
- Height: 40.51 metres (132.9 ft)

Technical details
- Floor count: 12

Design and construction
- Architect: Rouse & Goldstone

The Jarmulowsky Bank Building (also Nine Orchard) is a 12-story building on the Lower East Side of Manhattan in New York City. Located at Canal Street and Orchard Street, the Jarmulowsky Bank Building was built in 1912 and designed by architects William Lawrence Rouse and Lafayette A. Goldstone in the Beaux-Arts style. The building is clad with limestone on its lower stories and architectural terracotta on its upper stories.

Sender Jarmulowsky established the Jarmulowsky Bank in 1873. When World War I broke out two years after the building was completed, there was a run on the bank, as German investors withdrew funds to send to relatives abroad, and the bank failed. Until 1990, the building had a tempietto (more precisely a Monopteros) rising 50 feet to a dome ringed by eagles. It was modeled after the Choragic Monument of Lysicrates. According to local legend, the tempietto was added to ensure that the building would be taller than the nearby headquarters of the Jewish Daily Forward.

The building was renovated in 1990 by Sing May Realty and the tempietto destroyed. DLJ Real Estate Capital Partners announced plans in 2013 to convert the structure to a hotel. In 2014, the New York City Landmarks Preservation Commission approved a replica tempietto, which was completed by the beginning of 2020. The Nine Orchard luxury hotel opened at the building in June 2022. MML Hospitality bought Nine Orchard for $92 million in August 2025.

== See also ==
- National Register of Historic Places listings in Manhattan below 14th Street
- List of New York City Designated Landmarks in Manhattan below 14th Street
