= Karczewo, Podlaskie Voivodeship =

Karczewo
- Village
- Location within Poland
- Coordinates: 53°40′45″N 22°48′10″E
- Country: Poland
- Voivodeship: Podlaskie
- County: Grajewo
- Gmina: Rajgród

Karczewo [karˈt͡ʂɛvɔ] is a village in the administrative district of Gmina Rajgród, within Grajewo County, Podlaskie Voivodeship, in north-eastern Poland.
