= Danowo, Gmina Rajgród =

Danowo
- Village
- Location within Poland
- Coordinates: 53°40′55″N 22°34′31″E
- Country: Poland
- Voivodeship: Podlaskie
- County: Grajewo
- Gmina: Rajgród

Danowo [daˈnɔvɔ] is a village in the administrative district of Gmina Rajgród, within Grajewo County, Podlaskie Voivodeship, in north-eastern Poland.
