= Ciszewo, Podlaskie Voivodeship =

Ciszewo
- Village
- Location within Poland
- Coordinates: 53°39′N 22°42′E
- Country: Poland
- Voivodeship: Podlaskie
- County: Grajewo
- Gmina: Rajgród

Ciszewo [t͡ɕiˈʂɛvɔ] is a village in the administrative district of Gmina Rajgród, within Grajewo County, Podlaskie Voivodeship, in north-eastern Poland.
