= Bukowo, Podlaskie Voivodeship =

Bukowo
- Village
- Location within Poland
- Coordinates: 53°42′01″N 22°33′24″E
- Country: Poland
- Voivodeship: Podlaskie
- County: Grajewo
- Gmina: Rajgród

Bukowo [buˈkɔvɔ] is a village in the administrative district of Gmina Rajgród, within Grajewo County, Podlaskie Voivodeship, in north-eastern Poland.
