= Kozłówka, Podlaskie Voivodeship =

Kozłówka
- Village
- Location within Poland
- Coordinates: 53°40′N 22°42′E
- Country: Poland
- Voivodeship: Podlaskie
- County: Grajewo
- Gmina: Rajgród
- Population: 130

Kozłówka [kɔˈzwufka] is a village in the administrative district of Gmina Rajgród, within Grajewo County, Podlaskie Voivodeship, in north-eastern Poland.
