= Krystyna Karwowska =

Polish professor of agricultural science

Krystyna Karwowska (1931-2018) was a Polish professor of agricultural science. She worked in the Warsaw University of Life Sciences. Her interests include horticulture and medicinal herbs.

== Awards ==
- Gold Cross of Merit (Poland)
- Knight of the Order of Polonia Restituta
