= Tamma Srinivasa Reddy =

Indian photographer (born 1968)

- Born: 15 May 1968 (age 58); Tadepalle, Guntur district, Andhra Pradesh, India
- Occupation: Photojournalist
- Years active: 1984-present
- Known for: Photojournalism

Signature
- tsreddy.in

Tamma Srinivasa Reddy (born 1968) is an Indian photographer. He won first prize in national level photography contest organised by Vigyan Prasar, Department of Science and Technology (India), Pinnamaneni puraskaram and Hamsa Award conferred by Andhra Pradesh State Government in 2013.
