= Krzysztof Karwowski =

Polish journalist

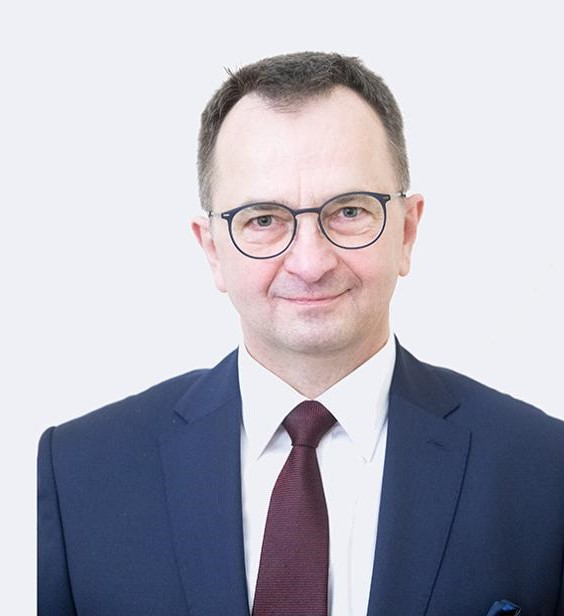

Poland Ambassador to Morocco
- In office 21 July 2020 – July 2024
- Preceded by: Marek Aleksander Ziółkowski

Personal details
- Born: 28 November 1963 (age 62) Warsaw, Poland
- Spouse: Elżbieta Karwowska
- Children: 2
- Education: Warsaw University of Technology
- Profession: Journalist

Krzysztof Karwowski (born 28 November 1963, Warsaw) is a Polish journalist, an ambassador to Morocco (2020–2024).

== Education and career ==
Krzysztof Karwowski grew up in Tangier, Morocco where his father has been working as an engineer. He has been attending French school there. In 1987, he graduated from civil engineering at the Warsaw University of Technology. He has been engaged in Polish dissident movement as a translator. He was taking part in the Solidarity election campaign in 1989. In 1980s he was cooperating with such French media as Ouest-France, Les Dernières Nouvelles d'Alsace, Libération, Le Monde, France 3.

In 1991, he joined Nowy Świat (New World) daily. Later, he was head of section at the Nowa Gazeta (New Gazette). Between 1993 and 1994 he was working for the SIS-Serwis as a correspondent, editor and deputy editor-in-chief. Following his short cooperation with Polskie Radio, he joined Polsat's Informacje (Informations) being in charge of preparing foreign news. Between 2001 and 2002 he was at Wydarzenia (Events) by TV Puls. From 2002 to 2007 he was heading the newsroom of Telekomunikacja Polska. From August 2007 to July 2008, back at TV Puls. In 2008, he joined Polish Television, working in managerial posts. In 2020 he was nominated ambassador to Morocco, additionally accredited to Mauritania. He took his post on 21 July 2020. He presented copies of his credentials on 25 August 2020. He ended his term in July 2024.

Besides Polish, he speaks French, English, and Russian. He is married to Elżbieta Karwowska, with 2 sons.
