= Woźnawieś =

- Village
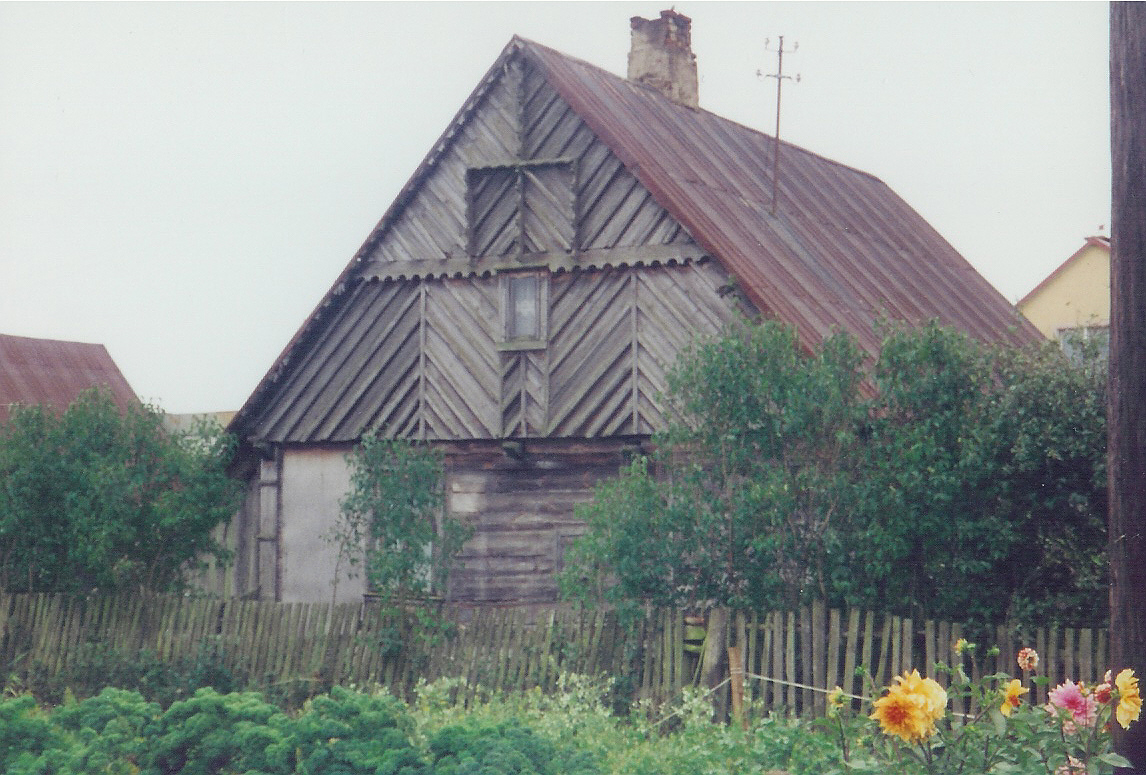

- Location within Poland
- Coordinates: 53°40′N 22°46′E
- Country: Poland
- Voivodeship: Podlaskie
- County: Grajewo
- Gmina: Rajgród
- Time zone: UTC+1 (CET)
  - Summer (DST): UTC+2 (CEST)
- Postal code: 19-206
- Area code: +48 86
- License plates: BGR

Woźnawieś [vɔʑˈnavjɛɕ] is a village in the administrative district of Gmina Rajgród, within Grajewo County, Podlaskie Voivodeship, in north-eastern Poland. It is located within the historic region of Podlachia.

Woźnawieś is the birthplace of Józef Sienkiewicz, father of Polish writer and Nobel Prize laureate Henryk Sienkiewicz.
