= Wykowo, Grajewo County =

Wykowo
- Settlement
- Location within Poland
- Coordinates: 53°36′59″N 22°34′42″E
- Country: Poland
- Voivodeship: Podlaskie
- County: Grajewo
- Gmina: Rajgród

Wykowo [vɨˈkɔvɔ] is a settlement in the administrative district of Gmina Rajgród, within Grajewo County, Podlaskie Voivodeship, in north-eastern Poland.
