= Antoni Karwowski =

Polish painter (born 1948)

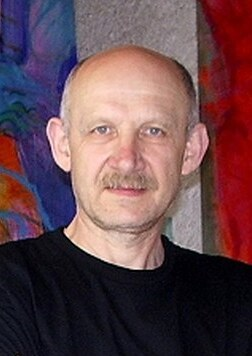
- Karwowski in 2007
- Born: 14 April 1948 (age 77); Grajewo, Poland
- Known for: Painting
- Style: Performance art; Installation art; Video art; Visual poetry
- Movement: Art Abstraction

Antoni Karwowski (born 14 April 1948) is a Polish lyrical abstraction and neo-figuration painter and performance artist active since the 1980s.

== Early life and family ==
Antoni Karwowski was born and raised in Grajewo, Eastern Poland, near Biebrza National Park. His father, Józef Karwowski, was a social worker, and his mother, Larysa Karwowski (née Zub), was a hairdresser. He has a younger brother named Maciej.

Karwowski grew up in a multigenerational household. His father gave him his first drawing lesson, while his grandfather wrote poetry and sang old Russian songs. Aspects of Polish and Russian culture and tradition, along with his upbringing in a wilderness environment, influenced his childhood.

== Painting and performance art ==
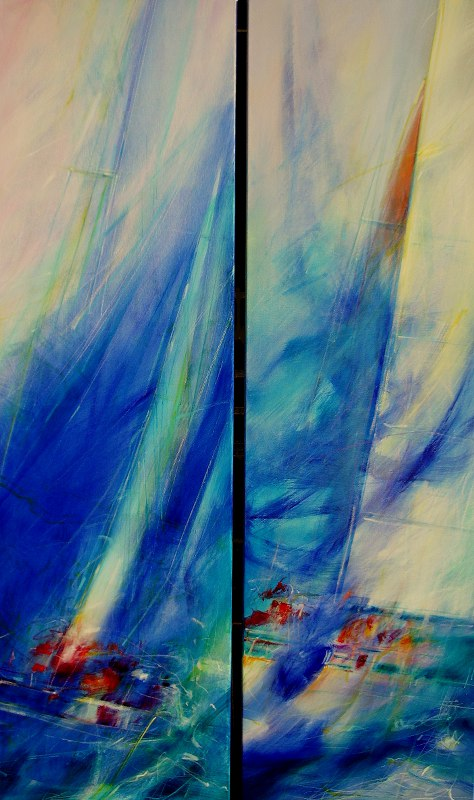
Regaty painting by Karwowski

After graduating from high school, Karwowski began painting and experimenting with various art media. During his art studies, he transferred between several universities and worked as a miner. He later joined the Fine Arts Faculty at the Nicolaus Copernicus University in Toruń.

In the late 1970s, Karwowski and Zbigniew Oleszynski co-founded the Polish performance group "Group A". Karwowski has remained active in performance art, participating in and organizing events. Since 2003, he has organized the International Performance & Intermedia Festival in Szczecin.

A Berlin art critic described Karwowski's style as possessing "colorful light, which is created by perfection in his workshop," adding that "symbolic meanings and certain multilayers... are far from simple decorative function."

He has also received commissions from corporations and institutions, including Clinic in Dortmund (Germany), for which he created 53m long wall panels in 2005.

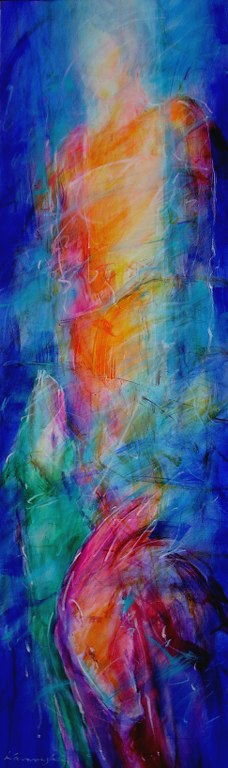
"Walking the dogs"

=== Art exhibitions ===
- 1981 – “Palacyk” - Wroclaw (Poland)
- 1985 - "Nagra Malare" - Vanersborg (Sweden)
- 1987 - "Bridge West & East" - Antwerpen (Belgium)
- 1988 - XV Festival of Polish Contemporary Art - Szczecin (Poland)
- 1988 - "Fine Art Gallery" - Trollhattan (Sweden)
- 1990 - "En-Garde Gallery" - Aarhus (Denmark)
- 1992 - Municipal Gallery - Nakskov (Denmark)
- 1992 - "Gaia Cztery Sezony" - Gerlesborg (Sweden)
- 1993 – “Cztery Zywioly” – Museum Greifswald (Germany)
- 1994 - "Forum Gallery" – Leverkusen (Germany)
- 1994 - "Anders Gallery" - Lünen (Germany)
- 1996 – “Forum Ost – West” – Bergisch Gladbach (Germany)
- 1999 - National Museum in Szczecin - Szczecin (Poland)
- 1999 - Galerie am Domplatz – Münster (Germany)
- 1999 - Ostholstein Museum—Eutin (Germany)
- 2001 – "Wystawa malarstwa, Reimus Gallery, Essen (Germany)
- 2001 - "RAUMTRIEB 2001," art festival—Berlin (Germany)
- 2001 – “Kunst am limit,” "Pussy" Berlin (Germany)
- 2001 - Europäisches Kulturzentrum - Köln (Germany)
- 2002 - "Distance 777," 68elf gallery—Köln (Germany)
- 2002 - Berliner Landtag – Berlin (Germany)
- 2003 - V International Baltic Biennial – Szczecin (Poland)
- 2004 – Project "MOTION" – Berlin (Germany)
- 2005 - Polish Art Fair 2005 - Poznan (Poland)
- 2005 - Art Platform - Tel Aviv (Israel)
- 2005 - "Galerie automatique" - Berlin-Strasbourg
- 2006 - Museum Contemporary Art – Naples (Italy)
- 2006 - Museum of Art - Santa Fe (Argentina)
- 2007 - "ZERO Gallery" - Berlin (Germany)
- 2007 – "Anders Gallery" - Lünen (Germany)
- 2010 - "Anders Gallery" - Lünen (Germany)

=== Selected performance projects ===
- 1980 – Public Space Action ”My Tram” – Torun (Poland)
- 1981 - "Koncert na Kaprala i grzalke" Teatr Otwarty "Kalambur" – Wroclaw (Poland)
- 1993 - "The Last Breath of Aborigine” – Gerlesborg (Sweden)
- 1998 - "Middle Ages Anatomy" & "Gilgamesh-Enkidu's" at Ermelerspeicher Gallery, Schwedt (Germany)
- 1998 - “Sentimental Trip on East" - Moltkerei Werkstatt, Cologne (Germany)
- 2001 - "Salz rm" - Berlin (Germany)
- 2005 - "Reading White Books" - Tel Aviv (Israel)
- 2010 - "Extension Series 2" - Grim Museum 2, Berlin (Germany)
- 2010 - "My Tram" - Szczecin (Poland)
- 2011 - La Porta 2011 - Barcelona (Spain)

=== Cultural projects involvement ===
- 1980–1981 Collaborated as an artist with Open Theatre Centre "Kalambur" in Wroclaw (Poland)
- 1981–1986 Organized and managed Centre of Art in Swinoujscie (Poland)
- 1992–1994 Co-organizer of the international project "Gaia the four elements"
- 1995–1999 Originator of the International Performance festival "Trawnik" (Poland – Germany)
- 2002–2005 Co-organizer of international performance project “Private impact”
- 2003–2009 Curator of International Performance & Intermedia Festival—Szczecin (Poland)
