= Tama, Podlaskie Voivodeship =

Tama
- Village
- Location within Poland
- Coordinates: 53°42′11″N 22°39′31″E
- Country: Poland
- Voivodeship: Podlaskie
- County: Grajewo
- Gmina: Rajgród
- Population: 100

Tama [ˈtama] is a village in the administrative district of Gmina Rajgród, within Grajewo County, Podlaskie Voivodeship, in north-eastern Poland.
