= Karwowo, Gmina Rajgród =

Karwowo
- Village
- Location within Poland
- Coordinates: 53°40′53″N 22°34′29″E
- Country: Poland
- Voivodeship: Podlaskie
- County: Grajewo
- Gmina: Rajgród

Karwowo [karˈvɔvɔ] is a village in the administrative district of Gmina Rajgród, within Grajewo County, Podlaskie Voivodeship, in north-eastern Poland.
