= Grajewo =

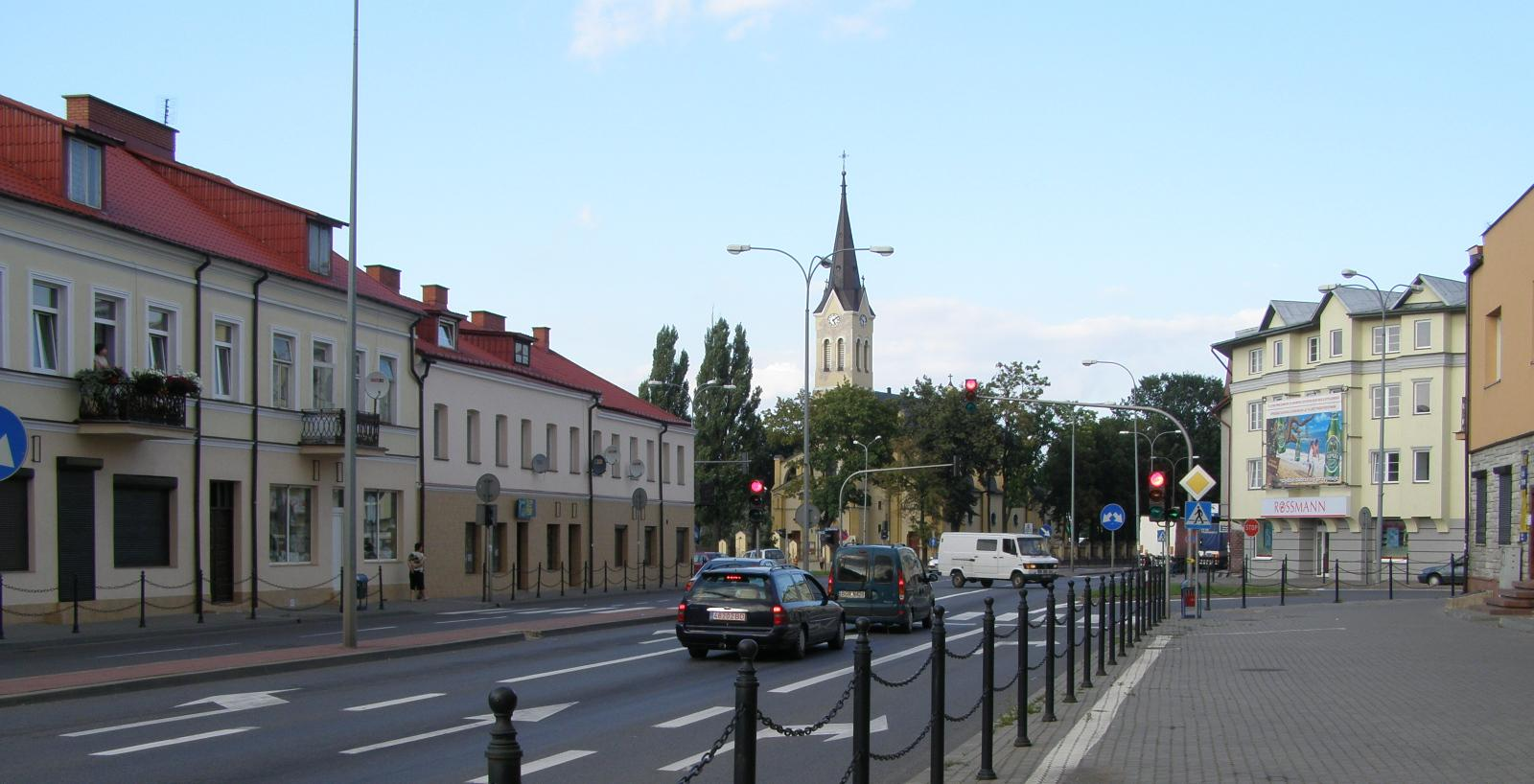
- Piłsudski Street in Grajewo

- Coat of arms

- Location within Poland
- Coordinates: 53°39′N 22°27′E
- Country: Poland
- Voivodeship: Podlaskie
- County: Grajewo
- Gmina: Grajewo (urban gmina)
- Established: 15th century
- Town rights: 1540

Government
  - Mayor: Maciej Bednarko

Area
  - Total: 18.93 km^{2} (7.31 sq mi)

Population (2016)
  - Total: 21,499
  - Density: 1,136/km^{2} (2,941/sq mi)
- Time zone: UTC+1 (CET)
  - Summer (DST): UTC+2 (CEST)
- Postal code: 19-200
- Area code: +48 86
- Car plates: BGR
- Website: http://www.grajewo.pl

Grajewo (pronounced [ɡraˈjɛvɔ]; Yiddish: גראיעווע, romanized: Grayeve) is a town in north-eastern Poland with 21,499 inhabitants (2016). It is the capital of Grajewo County within the Podlaskie Voivodeship. It is located within the historic region of Masovia, near the border with Podlachia and Masuria.

== History ==
At one time, the area was inhabited by the Yotvingians.

=== Kingdom of Poland ===
The first settlements in the region of modern Grajewo already existed in the early 15th century. The first documented mention is from the year 1426. In the late 15th century the village was a small center of trade and crafts. In 1540 the town obtained municipal rights from Polish King Sigismund I the Old. In 1656, during the Deluge (Polish-Swedish war), the Battle of Prostki took place nearby. The town's population decreased dramatically as a result of the war. In 1692 the town came into the possession of the Wilczewski family, hailing from Wilczewo. In 1794 battles of the Polish Kościuszko Uprising were fought near Grajewo. In 1777, the town had 258 inhabitants, and in 1800 it had 218 inhabitants.

=== Partitions of Poland ===
During the retreat after the French invasion of Russia, Napoleon stopped in the town in December 1812. After the Partitions of Poland by the neighbouring empires, in 1815 Grajewo became part of Russian Congress Poland. In 1831 victorious battles of the November Uprising took place near Grajewo. In the second half of the 19th century, trade and handicrafts developed. After the massacres of Polish protesters committed by the Russians in Warsaw in 1861, Polish demonstrations and clashes with Russian soldiers took place in Grajewo. During the January Uprising, on March 12, 1864, a clash between Polish insurgents and Russian troops took place near the town, won by Poles. Due to the participation of the population in the January Uprising, the town lost its municipal rights in 1870. With the establishment of a rail link between the then-German-controlled city of Ełk and the then-Russian-controlled city of Białystok, the town's development was accelerated.

A Jewish community existed in Grajewo from the late 18th century. As a result of the discriminatory Russian regulations (Pale of Settlement), at times Jews formed a majority of the town population. In 1808, 197 Jews lived in the town, 39% of the total population. In 1827 they made up a majority, with 57% of the population. In 1857 the percentage rose to 76% and in 1897 over 4,000 Jews lived in the town. During World War I the town was occupied by Germany. During the war a large part of the town was destroyed.

=== Interwar Poland ===
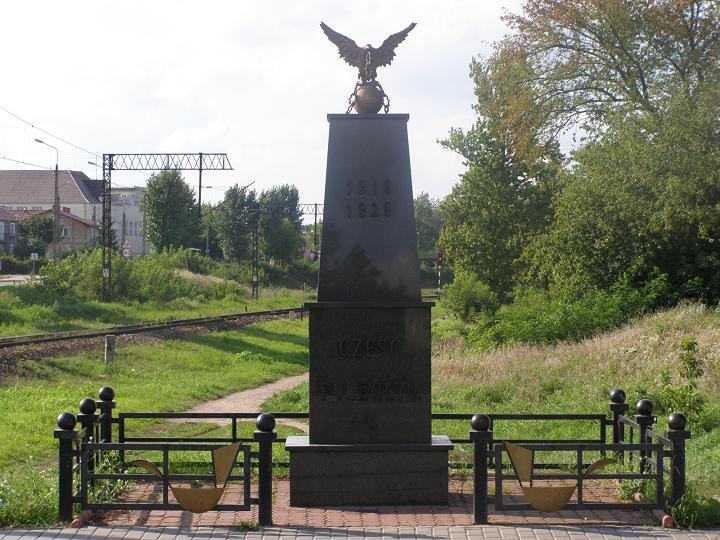
A 1928-monument commemorating the 10th anniversary of Poland regaining independence

Following the war, the town became part of the re-established Polish state, the Second Polish Republic, and was granted municipal rights again on July 4, 1919. Between the world wars, Grajewo was the seat of a district office and had around 9,500 inhabitants. New schools were established in Grajewo in 1919 and 1931.

Following the war, the Jewish population fell sharply. According to the 1921 census, the population was 60.9% Polish and 38.5% Jewish.

The highest Polish dignitaries visited Grajewo in the interwar period: Marshal Józef Piłsudski in 1921, President Stanisław Wojciechowski in 1925 and President Ignacy Mościcki in 1929.

=== World War II ===
The pre-war population of 9,500 included 3,000 Jews. The Germans occupied the town for three weeks from 6–7 September 1939. During the German occupation the synagogue and Bet Midrash were burned down by Germans and 300 Jewish men were deported to a forced labor camp in East Prussia. The town was then handed over to the Soviet Union. The Soviets deported many Polish inhabitants, especially the intelligentsia, military, policemen, foresters, officials, wealthier merchants, farmers and craftsmen and their families, to the Far North (Arctic Circle), Siberia and Kazakhstan. Several Poles from Grajewo were murdered by the Soviets in the Katyn massacre in 1940.

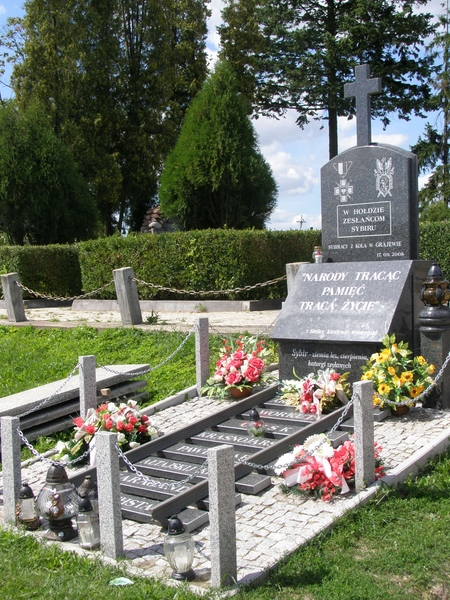
A monument commemorating Poles of Grajewo deported to Siberia during the Soviet occupation

On June 22, 1941, during Operation Barbarossa, German border guards shelled the town and then occupied it, setting up a military command post in the town. Adult Jews were employed in forced labor by the Germans. On 29 June 1941, following Sunday mass, local Polish anti-Semites carried out a pogrom killing 10 Jews and injuring dozens of others. However the next day on 30 June the Jews of the town were assembled at the market square by the German Gestapo and the Polish perpetrators of the pogrom were asked to identify communists who were then brutally beaten. 300 Jews, alleged communists, were arrested and placed in the old Synagogue. The Germans executed the survivors in August.

According to survivor testimony only some 1,600 of the 3,000 Jews of the town survived in August, and they were placed in a ghetto. On 2 November 1942 the SS surrounded the ghetto, and drove out the Jewish inhabitants to a transit camp in the village of Bogusze. From there they were sent to Treblinka extermination camp and Auschwitz concentration camp and most of them were murdered on arrival.

In July 1941, the Germans established a camp, which served both as a penal forced labour camp and a transit camp for Poles deported either to forced labour in Germany or to the Stutthof concentration camp. Around 3,500 people passed through it. In autumn of 1941, the occupiers established another transit camp for people deported from various regions to forced labour in Germany. The camp could accommodate about 1,000 people at a time. Some ill people were sent from it to the Majdanek concentration camp.

On July 15, 1943, in the Kosówka forest, the German gendarmerie in cooperation with the Gestapo murdered about 150 Poles, most of them inhabitants of Grajewo. On January 20, 1945, the Germans committed another mass murder in the Kosówka forest, killing 300 Polish inhabitants of the town. Five Polish Girl Scouts were murdered by the Germans in Grajewo.

The Red Army marched into Grajewo on January 23, 1945. According to data from 1945, 5,366 inhabitants of the Grajewo county lost their life during the war, only 163 in military operations, 5,009 as a result of the crimes of the occupiers. About 3000 of the deaths were of the town's Jewish population; only a few dozen survived. About 30% of the town was destroyed. It was restored to Poland, although with a Soviet-installed communist regime, which stayed in power until the Fall of Communism in the 1980s.

=== Post-war period ===
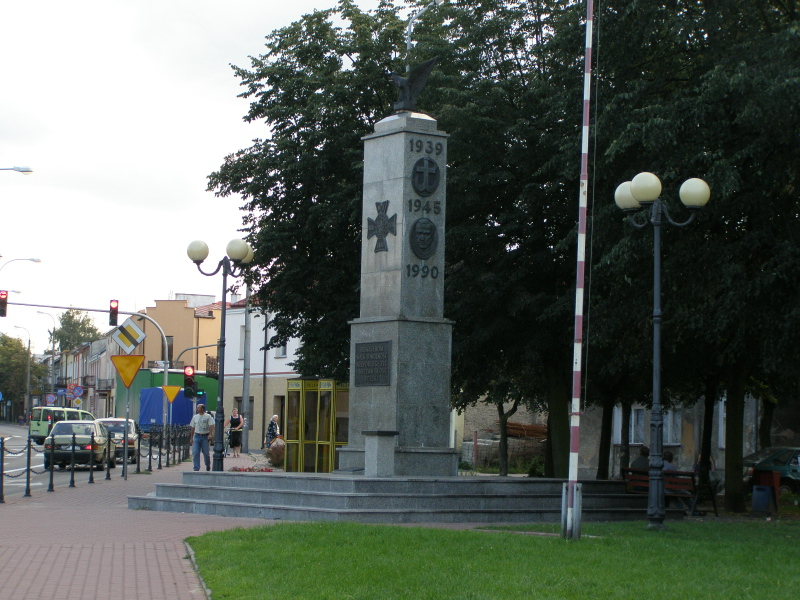
Independence Monument from 1990 in the town center

On May 8, 1945, the anti-communist Home Army seized the buildings of the communist Public Security in Grajewo and freed over 100 prisoners.

In 1967, the Dairy Plant in Grajewo was established. Over time, as Mlekpol, it became one of the largest dairy cooperatives in Poland. In 2016, the first Milk Museum in Poland was opened in Grajewo.

From 1975 to 1998, it was administratively located in the Łomża Voivodeship. In 1990, the Independence Monument was unveiled in the city center.

In 2000, President Aleksander Kwaśniewski visited Grajewo. A few years later, in 2006, Grajewo was visited by Prime Minister Jarosław Kaczyński, whose father was born in the town.

== Demographics ==
Historical population

Year	Pop.	±%
1890	7,013	—
1897	7,651	+9.1%
1910	8,558	+11.9%
1921	7,346	−14.2%
1931	9,036	+23.0%

Year	Pop.	±%
1939	10,000	+10.7%
1950	6,378	−36.2%
1960	8,625	+35.2%
2010	22,239	+157.8%

== Points of interest ==
Historic sights of Grajewo (examples)

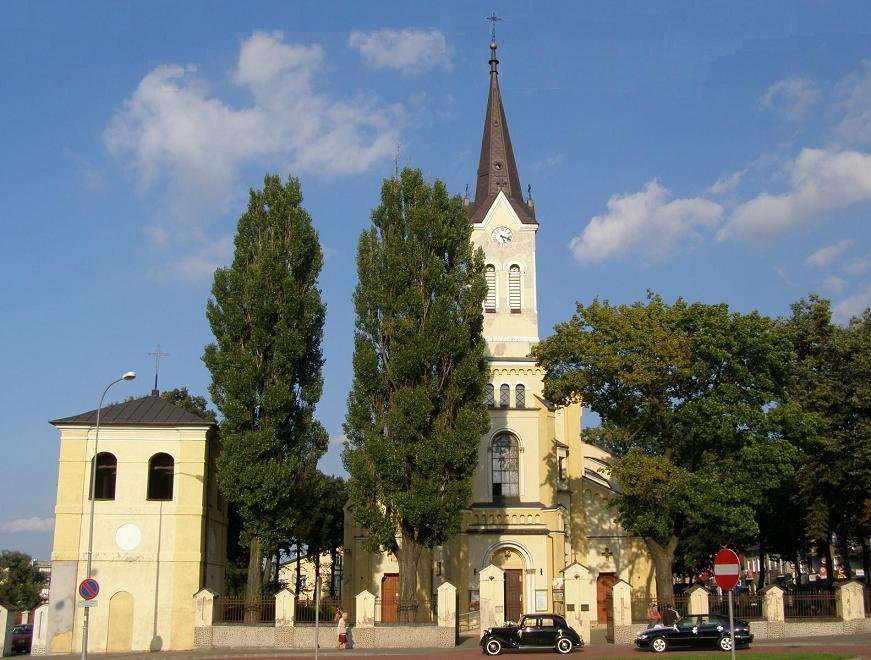
Church of the Holy Trinity

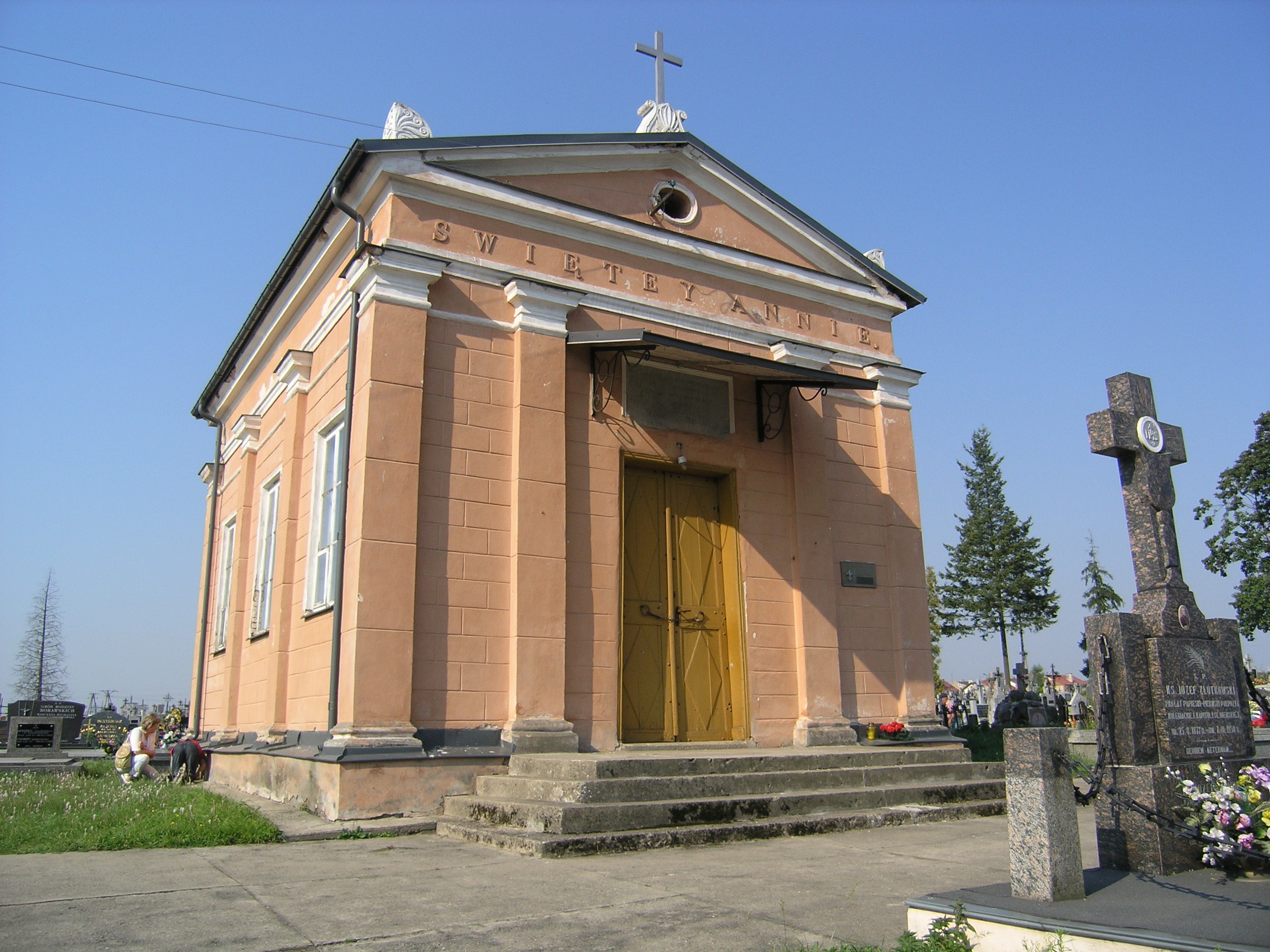
Wilczewski chapel at the cemetery

- Wooden houses from the 19th century
- Classicist chapel of Wilczewski family from 1839 at the cemetery
- Neo-Gothic church of the Holy Trinity from 1882
- Church belfry from 1837
- Tavern from mid 19th century
- Railway station from 1873
- Roadside chapels from mid 19th century
- Building of a local Secondary School from 1931
- The market square from the 18th century
- Former officer's mess
- Milk Museum (Muzeum Mleka)

== Transport ==
Grajewo lies on national road 65 connecting it to the town of Ełk and Białystok.

Grajewo has a station on the railway line between Ełk and Białystok.

== Sports ==
- Warmia Grajewo – football club
- Płyty Grajewo – defunct basketball club, which played in the top division in 1997-98

The 2008 Tour de Pologne cycling route ran through the city.

== International relations ==
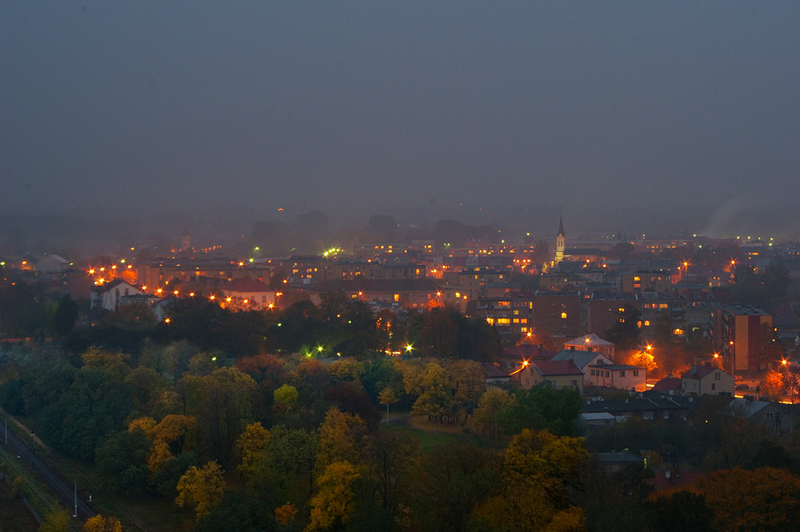
Panorama of Grajewo

Grajewo is twinned with:

- Gusev, Russia
- Varėna, Lithuania

== Notable people from Grajewo ==
- Rita Briansky - Polish-born Canadian painter and printmaker
- Eliyahu-Moshe Ganhovsky - Israeli politician and religious Zionist activist
- Sender Jarmulowsky - Shipping agent in Hamburg and banker in New York
- Antoni Karwowski - Polish painter and performance artist
- Elyah Lopian - prominent rabbi
- Maciej Makuszewski - Polish footballer
- Eliyahu Meridor - Israeli politician who served as a member of the Knesset
- Simon Rawidowicz - American Jewish philosopher
- Andrzej Szczytko - Polish film director and actor
- Jacob Sapirstein - Founder, American Greetings Corporation, greeting card manufacturer.
