= Możanka =

Location
- Country: Poland
- Voivodeship: Warmian–Masurian
- County (Powiat): Olecko
- Gmina: Gmina Olecko

Physical characteristics
- Source
  - location: west of Borawskie Małe
  - coordinates: 54°06′28″N 22°33′45″E
- Mouth: Great Olecko Lake
  - location: along the northwestern shore, south of Pieńki
  - coordinates: 54.0536°N 22.5050°E
  - elevation: 156.8 m (514 ft)
- Length: 16.76 km (10.41 mi)

Basin features
- Progression: Lega→ Biebrza→ Narew→ Vistula→ Baltic Sea

Możanka is a river of Poland. It flows into the Great Olecko Lake, which is drained by the river Lega, near Olecko.
