= Judziki, Olecko County =

Judziki
- Village
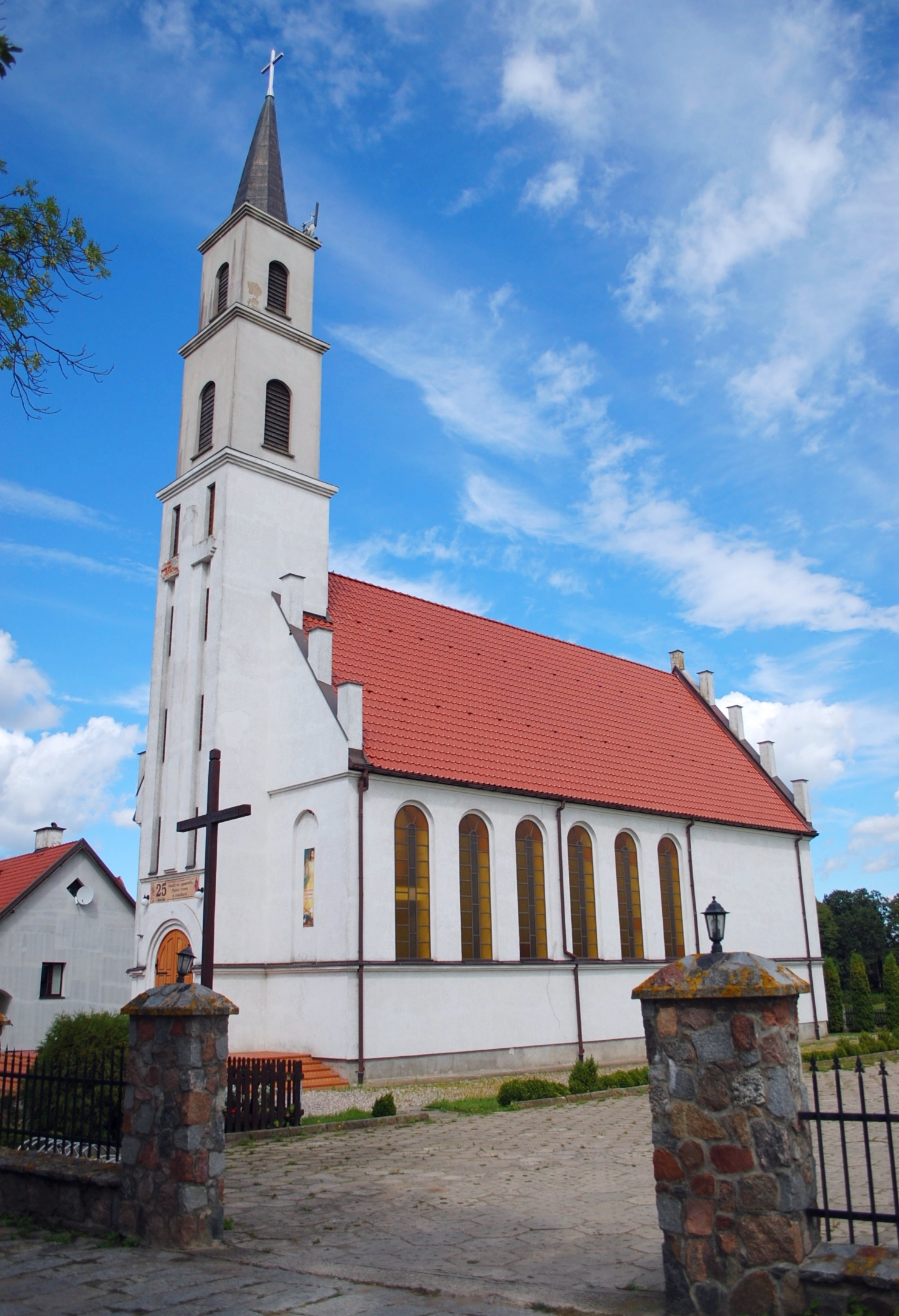
- Saints Peter and Paul church in Judziki

- Location within Poland
- Coordinates: 54°8′N 22°31′E
- Country: Poland
- Voivodeship: Warmian-Masurian
- County: Olecko
- Gmina: Olecko
- Founded: 1561
- Time zone: UTC+1 (CET)
  - Summer (DST): UTC+2 (CEST)
- Vehicle registration: NOE

Judziki [juˈd͡ʑiki] is a village in the administrative district of Gmina Olecko, within Olecko County, Warmian-Masurian Voivodeship, in north-eastern Poland. It is located in the historic region of Masuria.

== History ==
The origins of the village date back to 1561, when a man named Jakub bought land to establish a village. As of 1600, the population was solely Polish. In 1938, during a massive campaign of renaming of placenames, the Nazi government of Germany renamed the village to Wiesenhöhe in attempt to erase traces of Polish origin. After Germany's defeat in World War II, in 1945, the village became again part of Poland and its historic Polish name was restored.
