= Dąbrowskie, Olecko County =

Dąbrowskie
- Village
- Location within Poland
- Coordinates: 54°6′N 22°33′E
- Country: Poland
- Voivodeship: Warmian-Masurian
- County: Olecko
- Gmina: Olecko
- Founded: 1562
- Founder: Stanisław Milewski
- Time zone: UTC+1 (CET)
  - Summer (DST): UTC+2 (CEST)
- Vehicle registration: NOE

Dąbrowskie [dɔmˈbrɔfskʲɛ] is a village in the administrative district of Gmina Olecko, within Olecko County, Warmian-Masurian Voivodeship, in north-eastern Poland. It is part of the region of Masuria.

== History ==
Dąbrowskie was founded in 1562 by mayor of nearby Olecko Stanisław Milewski, who bought land to establish a village. As of 1600, the population of the village was solely Polish. The village had two equivalent names Dąbrowskie and Milewskie with the latter derived from the last name of its founder. In 1938, during a massive campaign of renaming of placenames, the government of Nazi Germany renamed it to Königsruh in attempt to erase traces of Polish origin. In 1939, it had a population of 333. Following Germany's defeat in World War II, in 1945, the village became again part of Poland and its historic Polish name Dąbrowskie was restored.
