= Przytuły, Olecko County =

Przytuły
- Village
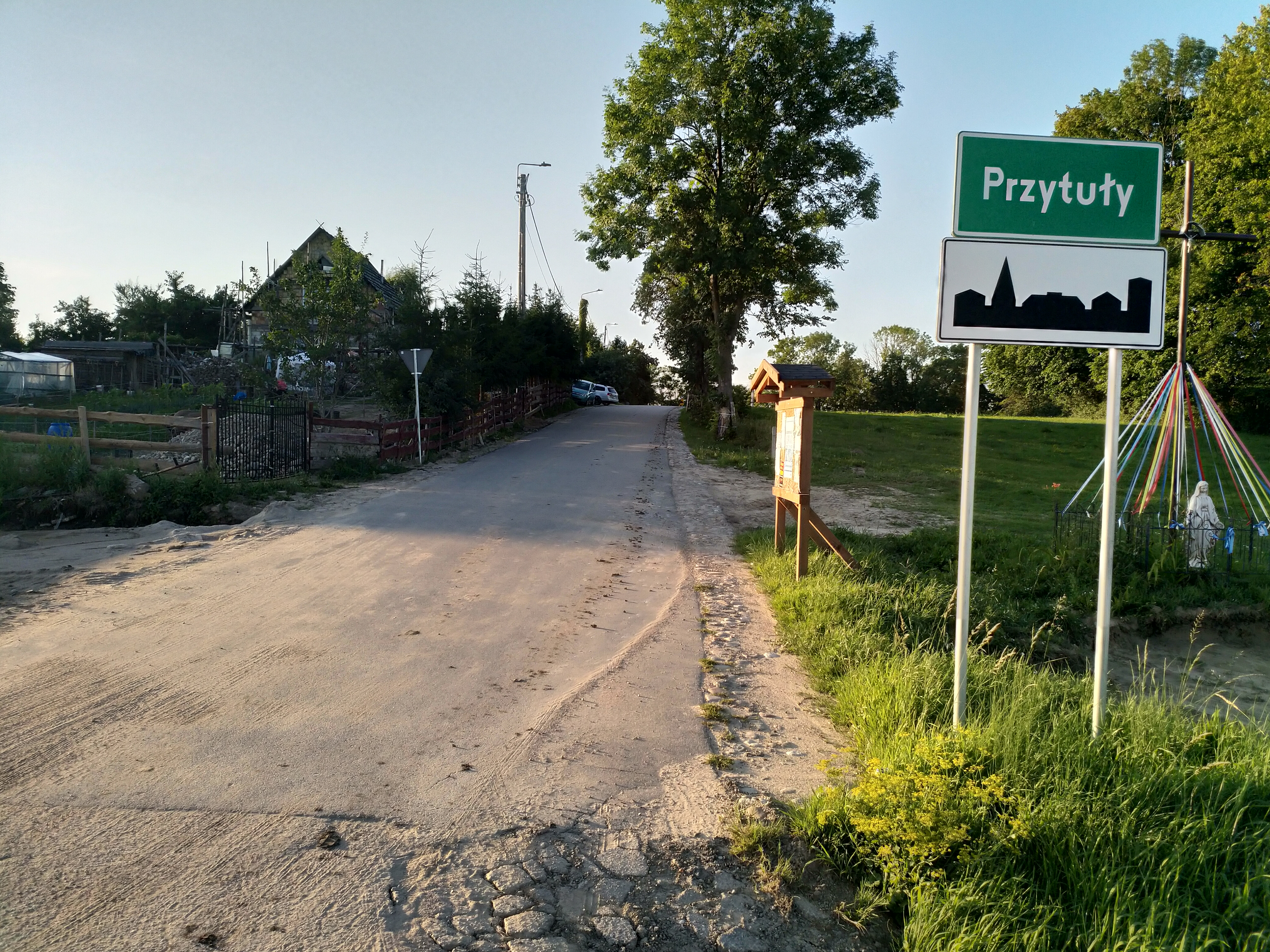

- Location within Poland
- Coordinates: 54°3′48″N 22°33′3″E
- Country: Poland
- Voivodeship: Warmian-Masurian
- County: Olecko
- Gmina: Olecko
- Founded: 1564
- Population: 270
- Time zone: UTC+1 (CET)
  - Summer (DST): UTC+2 (CEST)
- Vehicle registration: NOE

Przytuły [pʂɨˈtuwɨ] is a village in the administrative district of Gmina Olecko, within Olecko County, Warmian-Masurian Voivodeship, in north-eastern Poland.

It is located in Masuria.

== History ==
The origins of the village date back to 1564, when Marek Bartosz from Wilkasy bought land to establish a village. As of 1600, the population was solely Polish. In 1938, during a massive campaign of renaming of placenames, the Nazi government of Germany renamed the village to Siebenbergen in attempt to erase traces of Polish origin. After Germany's defeat in World War II, in 1945, the village became again part of Poland and its historic Polish name was restored.
