= Dobki, Warmian-Masurian Voivodeship =

Dobki
- Village
- Location within Poland
- Coordinates: 54°3′N 22°24′E
- Country: Poland
- Voivodeship: Warmian-Masurian
- County: Olecko
- Gmina: Olecko
- Founded: 1555
- Time zone: UTC+1 (CET)
  - Summer (DST): UTC+2 (CEST)
- Vehicle registration: NOE

Dobki [ˈdɔpki] is a village in the administrative district of Gmina Olecko, within Olecko County, Warmian-Masurian Voivodeship, in northern Poland. It is located on the southern shore of Dobskie Lake in the region of Masuria.

== History ==
The origins of the village date back to 1555, when Marcin Kibisz bought land to establish a village. The village historically had two equivalent Polish names, Dobki and Kibisze, the latter of which was derived from the last name of its founder. It was populated by Poles from the beginning, and as of 1600, the population was solely Polish. Under Nazi Germany, the village was renamed Markgrafsfelde to erase traces of Polish origin. Following World War II, in 1945, the village became again part of Poland and its historic Polish name Dobki was restored.
