= Skowronki, Warmian-Masurian Voivodeship =

Skowronki
- Village
- Location within Poland
- Coordinates: 54°0′20″N 22°31′36″E
- Country: Poland
- Voivodeship: Warmian-Masurian
- County: Olecko
- Gmina: Olecko
- Population: 40

Skowronki [skɔˈvrɔnki] is a village in the administrative district of Gmina Olecko, within Olecko County, Warmian-Masurian Voivodeship, in northern Poland.
