= Świdry =

Świdry may refer to the following places:

- Świdry, Łuków County in Lublin Voivodeship (east Poland)
- Świdry, Gmina Opole Lubelskie in Opole County, Lublin Voivodeship (east Poland)
- Świdry, Giżycko County in Warmian-Masurian Voivodeship (north Poland)
- Świdry, Olecko County in Warmian-Masurian Voivodeship (north Poland)
- Świdry, Pisz County in Warmian-Masurian Voivodeship (north Poland)

== See also ==
- Swider (disambiguation)
