= Plewki, Warmian-Masurian Voivodeship =

Plewki
- Village
- Location within Poland
- Coordinates: 54°7′37″N 22°34′23″E
- Country: Poland
- Voivodeship: Warmian-Masurian
- County: Olecko
- Gmina: Olecko

Plewki [ˈplɛfki] is a village in the administrative district of Gmina Olecko, within Olecko County, Warmian-Masurian Voivodeship, in northern Poland.
