= Dąbrowskie-Osiedle =

- Settlement
- Location within Poland
- Coordinates: 54°04′30″N 22°33′31″E
- Country: Poland
- Voivodeship: Warmian-Masurian
- County: Olecko
- Gmina: Olecko

Dąbrowskie-Osiedle [dɔmˈbrɔfskʲɛ ɔˈɕɛdlɛ] is a settlement in the administrative district of Gmina Olecko, within Olecko County, Warmian-Masurian Voivodeship, in northern Poland.
