= Swider =

Swider may refer to:

- Świder, river in Masovia, Poland
- Świder, Lublin Voivodeship, village in eastern Poland
- Świder railway station in Otwock, Poland
- Swider (surname)

== See also ==
- Swiderian culture
- Świdry (disambiguation)
