= Raczki Wielkie =

- Village
- Location within Poland
- Coordinates: 54°4′N 22°36′E
- Country: Poland
- Voivodeship: Warmian-Masurian
- County: Olecko
- Gmina: Olecko

Raczki Wielkie [ˈrat͡ʂki ˈvjɛlkʲɛ] is a village in the administrative district of Gmina Olecko, within Olecko County, Warmian-Masurian Voivodeship, in northern Poland.
