= Wólka Kijewska =

- Village
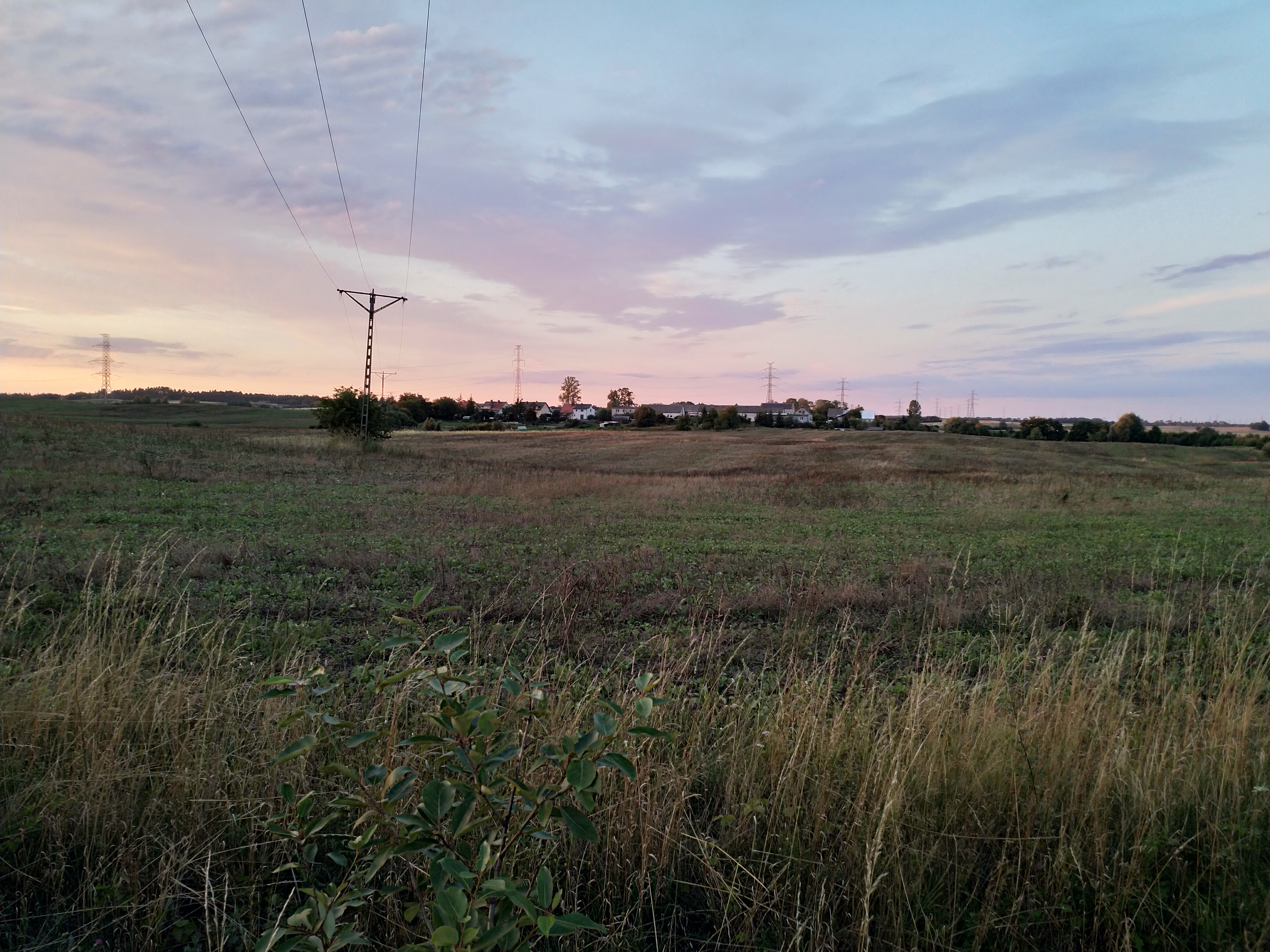
- Wólka Kijewska (2024)

- Location within Poland
- Coordinates: 53°55′45″N 22°29′47″E
- Country: Poland
- Voivodeship: Warmian-Masurian
- County: Olecko
- Gmina: Olecko
- Population: 110

Wólka Kijewska [ˈvulka kiˈjɛfska] is a village in the administrative district of Gmina Olecko, within Olecko County, Warmian-Masurian Voivodeship, in northern Poland.
