= Łęgowo, Olecko County =

Łęgowo
- Village
- Location within Poland
- Coordinates: 54°6′N 22°27′E
- Country: Poland
- Voivodeship: Warmian-Masurian
- County: Olecko
- Gmina: Olecko
- Founded: 1561
- Time zone: UTC+1 (CET)
  - Summer (DST): UTC+2 (CEST)
- Vehicle registration: NOE

Łęgowo [wɛnˈɡɔvɔ] is a village in the administrative district of Gmina Olecko, within Olecko County, Warmian-Masurian Voivodeship, in north-eastern Poland. It is located in the region of Masuria.

== History ==
The origins of the village date back to 1561, when Stańko Olszewski bought land to establish a village. As of 1600, the population was solely Polish. In 1858, the village had a population of 281.

== Transport ==
The Polish National road 65 runs nearby, east of the village.
