= Olszewo, Olecko County =

Olszewo
- Village
- Location within Poland
- Coordinates: 54°4′21″N 22°23′44″E
- Country: Poland
- Voivodeship: Warmian-Masurian
- County: Olecko
- Gmina: Olecko
- Founded: 1563
- Founder: Mikołaj Lipiński
- Time zone: UTC+1 (CET)
  - Summer (DST): UTC+2 (CEST)
- Vehicle registration: NOE

Olszewo [ɔlˈʂɛvɔ] is a village in the administrative district of Gmina Olecko, within Olecko County, Warmian-Masurian Voivodeship, in northern Poland.

It is located in Masuria.

== History ==
The village was founded in 1563 by Mikołaj Lipiński. It was historically known in Polish as Olszewo and Lipińskie.

As of 1870, it was inhabited by 513 Poles and 123 Germans.
