= Babki Oleckie =

- Village
- Location within Poland
- Coordinates: 54°5′N 22°30′E
- Country: Poland
- Voivodeship: Warmian-Masurian
- County: Olecko
- Gmina: Olecko
- Founded: 1562
- Time zone: UTC+1 (CET)
  - Summer (DST): UTC+2 (CEST)
- Vehicle registration: NOE

Babki Oleckie [ˈbapki ɔˈlɛt͡skʲɛ] is a village in the administrative district of Gmina Olecko, within Olecko County, Warmian-Masurian Voivodeship, in north-eastern Poland. It is part of the region of Masuria.

== History ==
Babki was founded in 1562 by Piotr Klimaszewski and Marcin Czerwonka, who bought land to establish a village. As of 1600, the population of the village was solely Polish. A mill was built before 1640. In 1938, during a massive campaign of renaming of placenames, the government of Nazi Germany renamed it to Lagenquell in attempt to erase traces of Polish origin. In 1939, it had a population of 399. Following Germany's defeat in World War II, in 1945, the village became again part of Poland and its historic Polish name was restored with the addition of the adjective Oleckie after the nearby town and county seat of Olecko to distinguish it from other villages of the same name in Poland.
