= Borawskie, Warmian-Masurian Voivodeship =

Borawskie
- Village
- Location within Poland
- Coordinates: 54°6′N 22°37′E
- Country: Poland
- Voivodeship: Warmian-Masurian
- County: Olecko
- Gmina: Olecko

Borawskie [bɔˈrafskʲɛ] is a village in the administrative district of Gmina Olecko, within Olecko County, Warmian-Masurian Voivodeship, in northern Poland.
