= Zabielne, Olecko County =

Zabielne
- Village
- Location within Poland
- Coordinates: 53°58′N 22°24′E
- Country: Poland
- Voivodeship: Warmian-Masurian
- County: Olecko
- Gmina: Olecko

Zabielne [zaˈbjɛlnɛ] is a village in the administrative district of Gmina Olecko, within Olecko County, Warmian-Masurian Voivodeship, in northern Poland.
