= Giże, Gmina Olecko =

Giże
- Village
- Location within Poland
- Coordinates: 54°00′53″N 22°23′05″E
- Country: Poland
- Voivodeship: Warmian-Masurian
- County: Olecko
- Gmina: Olecko

Giże [ˈɡiʐɛ] is a village in the administrative district of Gmina Olecko, within Olecko County, Warmian-Masurian Voivodeship, in northern Poland.
