= Ślepie =

- Village
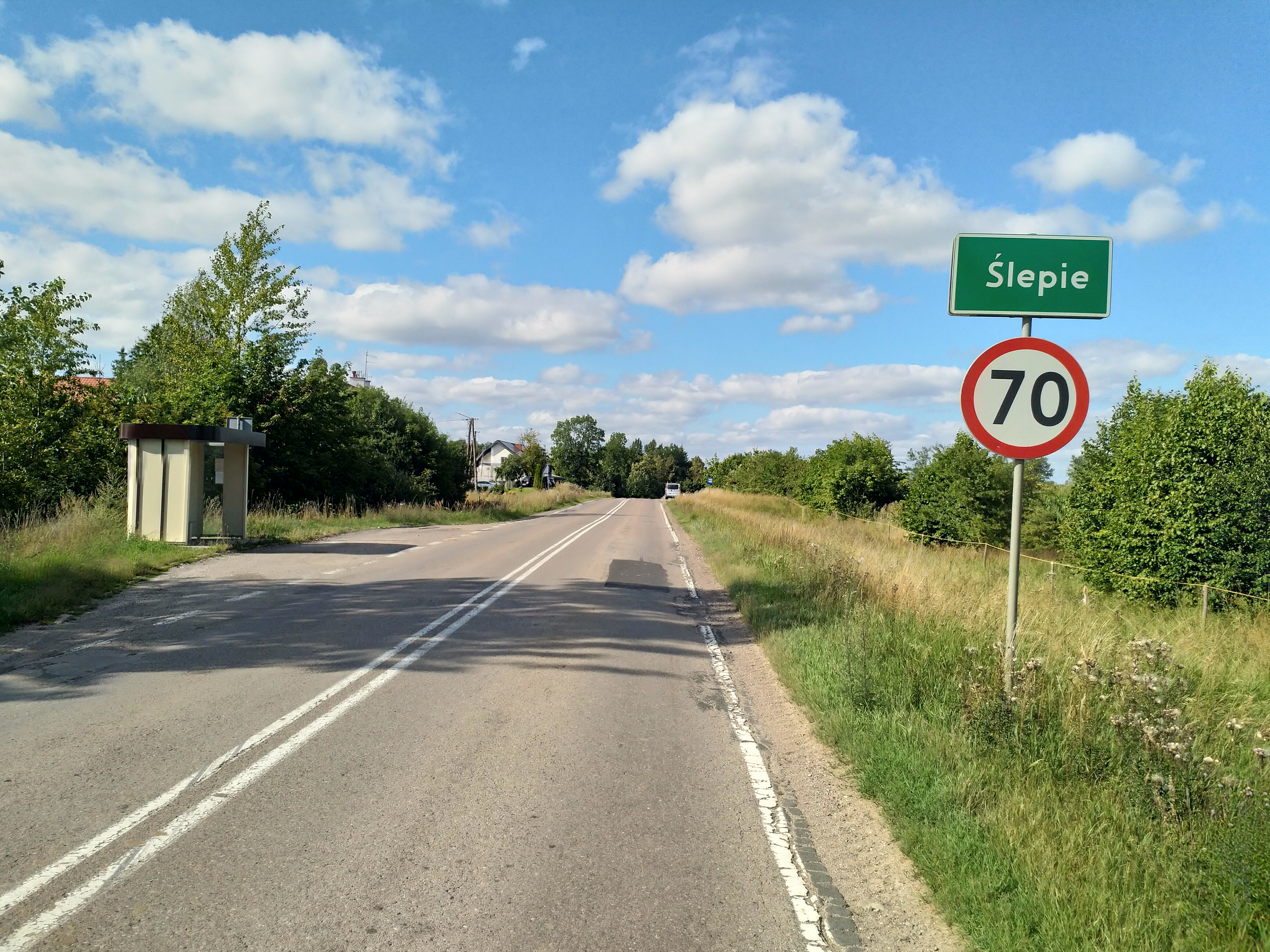

- Location within Poland
- Coordinates: 53°58′N 22°28′E
- Country: Poland
- Voivodeship: Warmian-Masurian
- County: Olecko
- Gmina: Olecko

Ślepie [ˈɕlɛpjɛ] is a village in the administrative district of Gmina Olecko, within Olecko County, Warmian-Masurian Voivodeship, in northern Poland.
