= Kijewo, Warmian-Masurian Voivodeship =

Kijewo
- Village
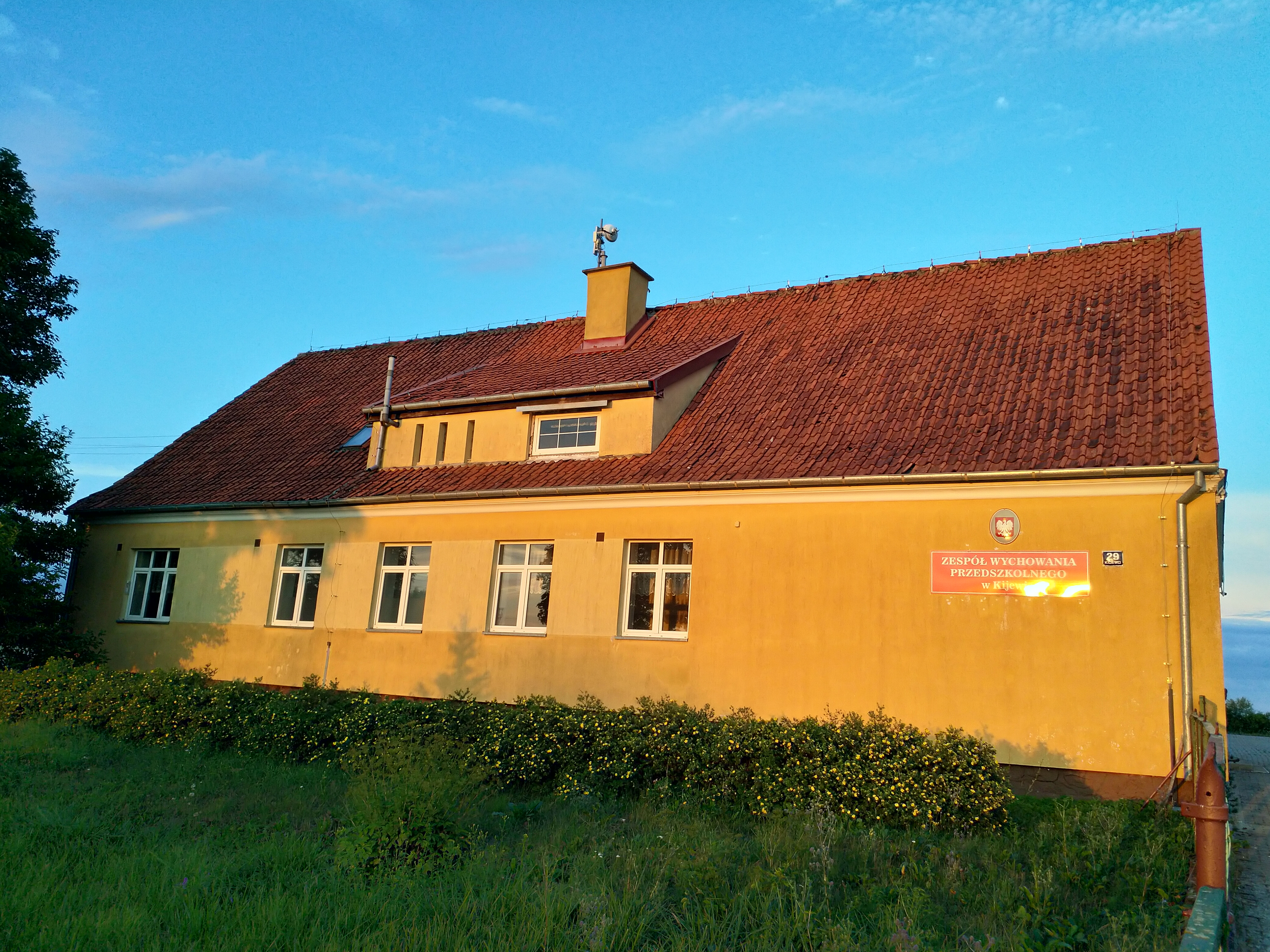
- Kijewo (2024)

- Location within Poland
- Coordinates: 53°55′N 22°30′E
- Country: Poland
- Voivodeship: Warmian-Masurian
- County: Olecko
- Gmina: Olecko

Kijewo [kiˈjɛvɔ] is a village in the administrative district of Gmina Olecko, within Olecko County, Warmian-Masurian Voivodeship, in northern Poland.
