= Kukowo, Warmian-Masurian Voivodeship =

Kukowo
- Village
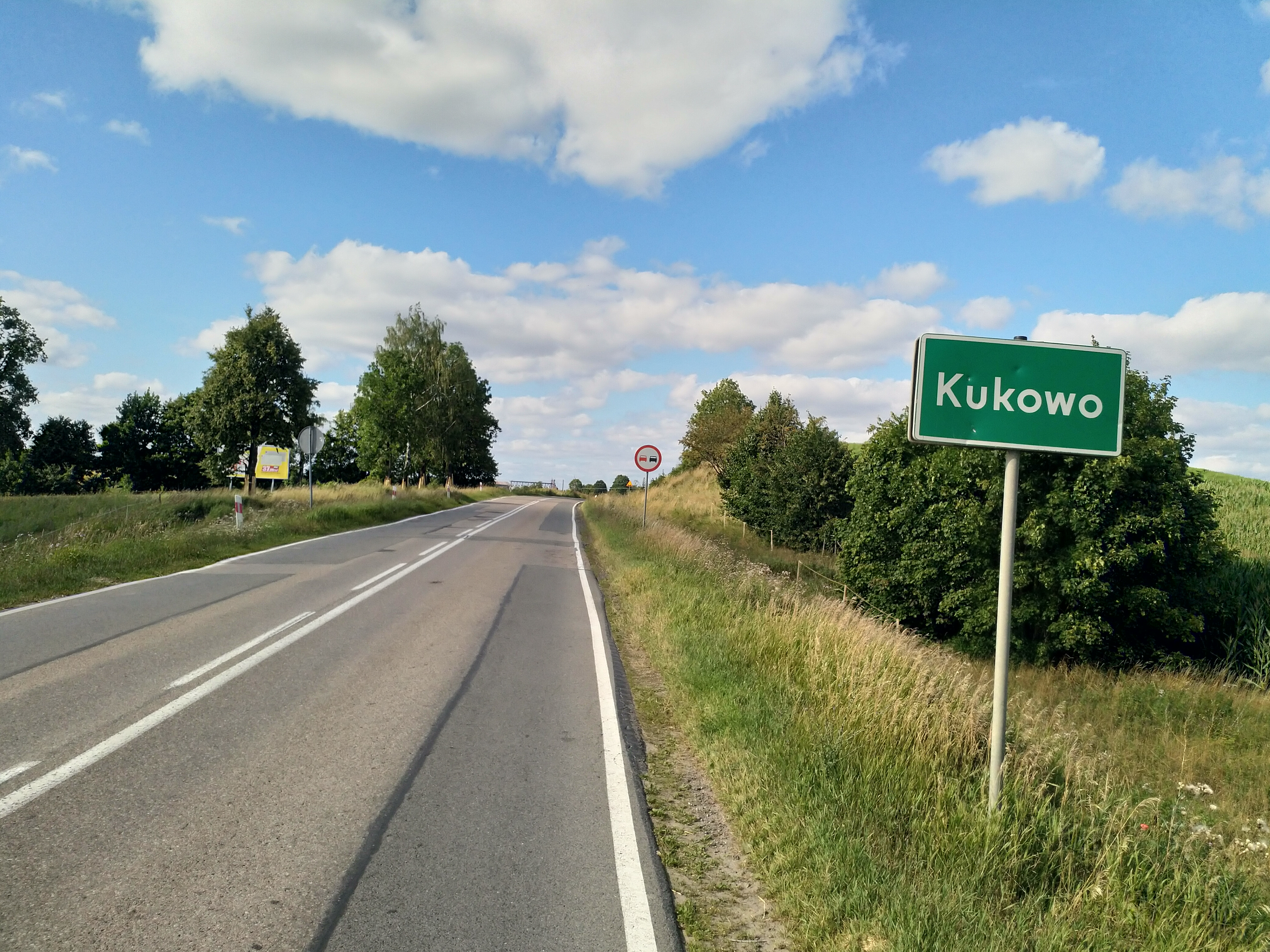

- Location within Poland
- Coordinates: 54°0′N 22°29′E
- Country: Poland
- Voivodeship: Warmian-Masurian
- County: Olecko
- Gmina: Olecko

Kukowo [kuˈkɔvɔ] is a village in the administrative district of Gmina Olecko, within Olecko County, Warmian-Masurian Voivodeship, in northern Poland.
