= Gąski, Olecko County =

Gąski
- Village
- Location within Poland
- Coordinates: 53°57′N 22°26′E
- Country: Poland
- Voivodeship: Warmian-Masurian
- County: Olecko
- Gmina: Olecko

Gąski [ˈɡɔ̃ski] is a village in the administrative district of Gmina Olecko, within Olecko County, Warmian-Masurian Voivodeship, in northern Poland.

== Notable residents ==
- Gerhard Olschewski (born 1942), German actor
