= Świderski =

Świderski (feminine Świderska) is a Polish surname. It may refer to:

- Adrian Świderski (born 1986), Polish triple jumper
- Bartłomiej Świderski (born 1973), Polish actor
- Ed Swiderski (born 1979), American marketing executive and reality TV contestant
- Grégoire Świderski (born 2005), Canadian soccer player
- Janina Kraupe-Świderska (1921–2016), Polish printmaker
- John Swiderski (born 1975), American programmer and video game developer
- Karol Świderski (born 1997), Polish footballer
- Piotr Świderski (born 1983), Polish motorcyclist
- Rudolf Swiderski (1878–1909), German chess player
- Sebastian Świderski (born 1977), Polish volleyball player
- Zdzisław Świderski (born 1940), Polish microbiologist

== See also ==
- Mount Swiderski, a mountain in Canada
