= Kolonia Olecko =

- Settlement
- Location within Poland
- Coordinates: 54°02′56″N 22°18′10″E
- Country: Poland
- Voivodeship: Warmian-Masurian
- County: Olecko
- Gmina: Olecko

Kolonia Olecko [kɔˈlɔɲa ɔˈlɛt͡skɔ] is a settlement in the administrative district of Gmina Olecko, within Olecko County, Warmian-Masurian Voivodeship, in northern Poland.
