= Duły =

- Village
- Location within Poland
- Coordinates: 54°3′1″N 22°24′57″E
- Country: Poland
- Voivodeship: Warmian-Masurian
- County: Olecko
- Gmina: Olecko
- Founded: 1558
- Founded by: Jan Duła
- Time zone: UTC+1 (CET)
  - Summer (DST): UTC+2 (CEST)
- Vehicle registration: NOE

Duły [ˈduwɨ] is a village in the administrative district of Gmina Olecko, within Olecko County, Warmian-Masurian Voivodeship, in north-eastern Poland. It is located on the northern shore of Dobskie Lake in the region of Masuria.

== History ==
Duły was founded in 1558 by Jan Duła, who bought land to establish a village. It was named after the founder. As of 1600, the population of the village was solely Polish. In 1939, it had a population of 260.
