= Doliwy, Warmian-Masurian Voivodeship =

Doliwy
- Village
- Location within Poland
- Coordinates: 54°03′01″N 22°21′16″E
- Country: Poland
- Voivodeship: Warmian-Masurian
- County: Olecko
- Gmina: Olecko

Doliwy [dɔˈlivɨ] is a village in the administrative district of Gmina Olecko, within Olecko County, Warmian-Masurian Voivodeship, in northern Poland.
