= Rosochackie =

- Village
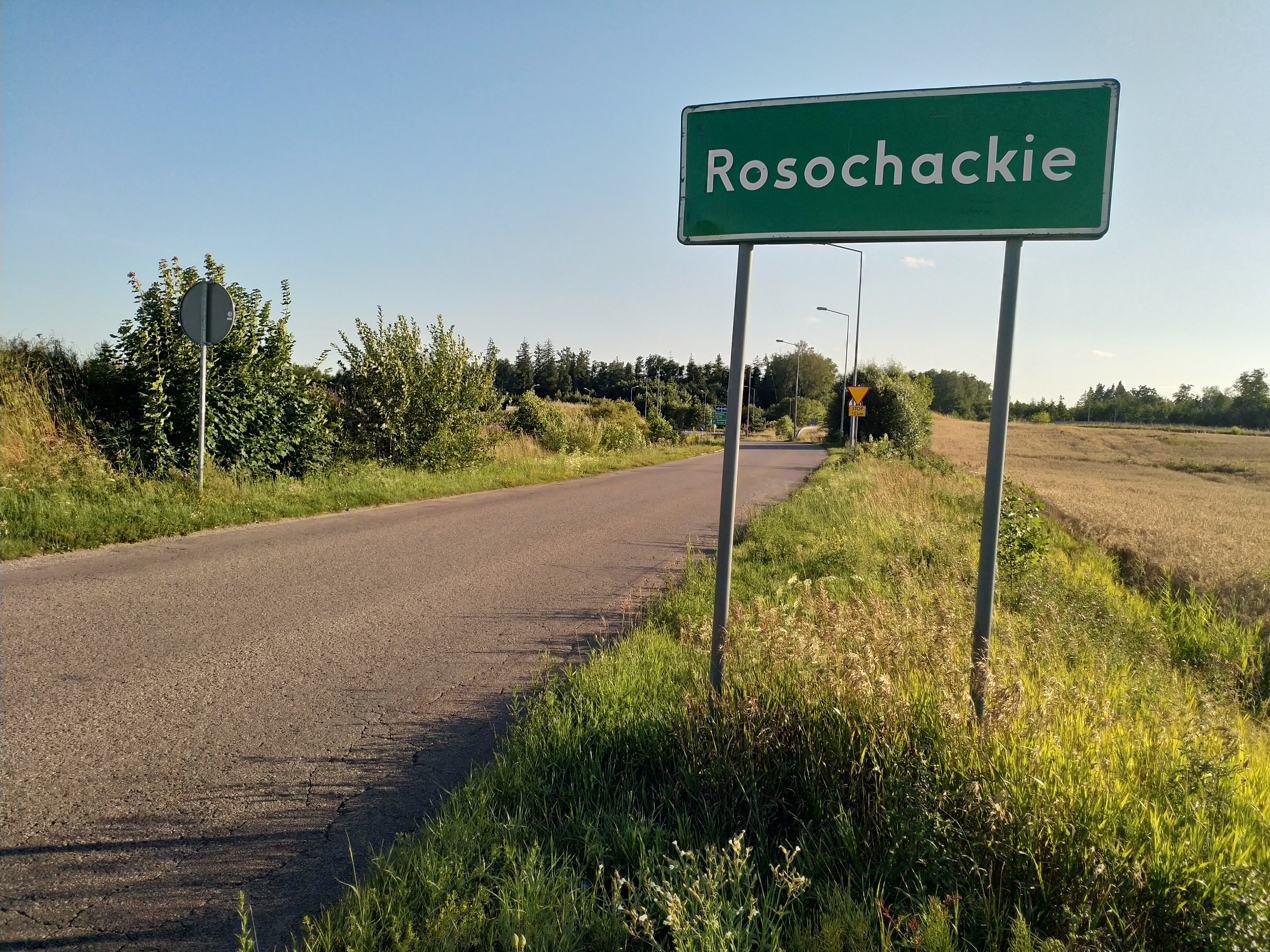

- Location within Poland
- Coordinates: 54°2′N 22°27′E
- Country: Poland
- Voivodeship: Warmian-Masurian
- County: Olecko
- Gmina: Olecko

Rosochackie [rɔsɔˈxat͡skʲɛ] (German: Albrechtsfelde; until 1927: Rosochatzken) is a village in the administrative district of Gmina Olecko, within Olecko County, Warmian-Masurian Voivodeship, in northern Poland.
