= Zatyki, Olecko County =

Zatyki
- Village
- Location within Poland
- Coordinates: 53°57′N 22°31′E
- Country: Poland
- Voivodeship: Warmian-Masurian
- County: Olecko
- Gmina: Olecko

Zatyki [zaˈtɨki] is a village in the administrative district of Gmina Olecko, within Olecko County, Warmian-Masurian Voivodeship, in northern Poland.
