= Lipkowo =

- Settlement
- Location within Poland
- Coordinates: 54°00′06″N 22°33′41″E
- Country: Poland
- Voivodeship: Warmian-Masurian
- County: Olecko
- Gmina: Olecko

Lipkowo [lipˈkɔvɔ] (German: Lindenhof) is a settlement in the administrative district of Gmina Olecko, within Olecko County, Warmian-Masurian Voivodeship, in northern Poland.
