= Gordejki Małe =

- Village
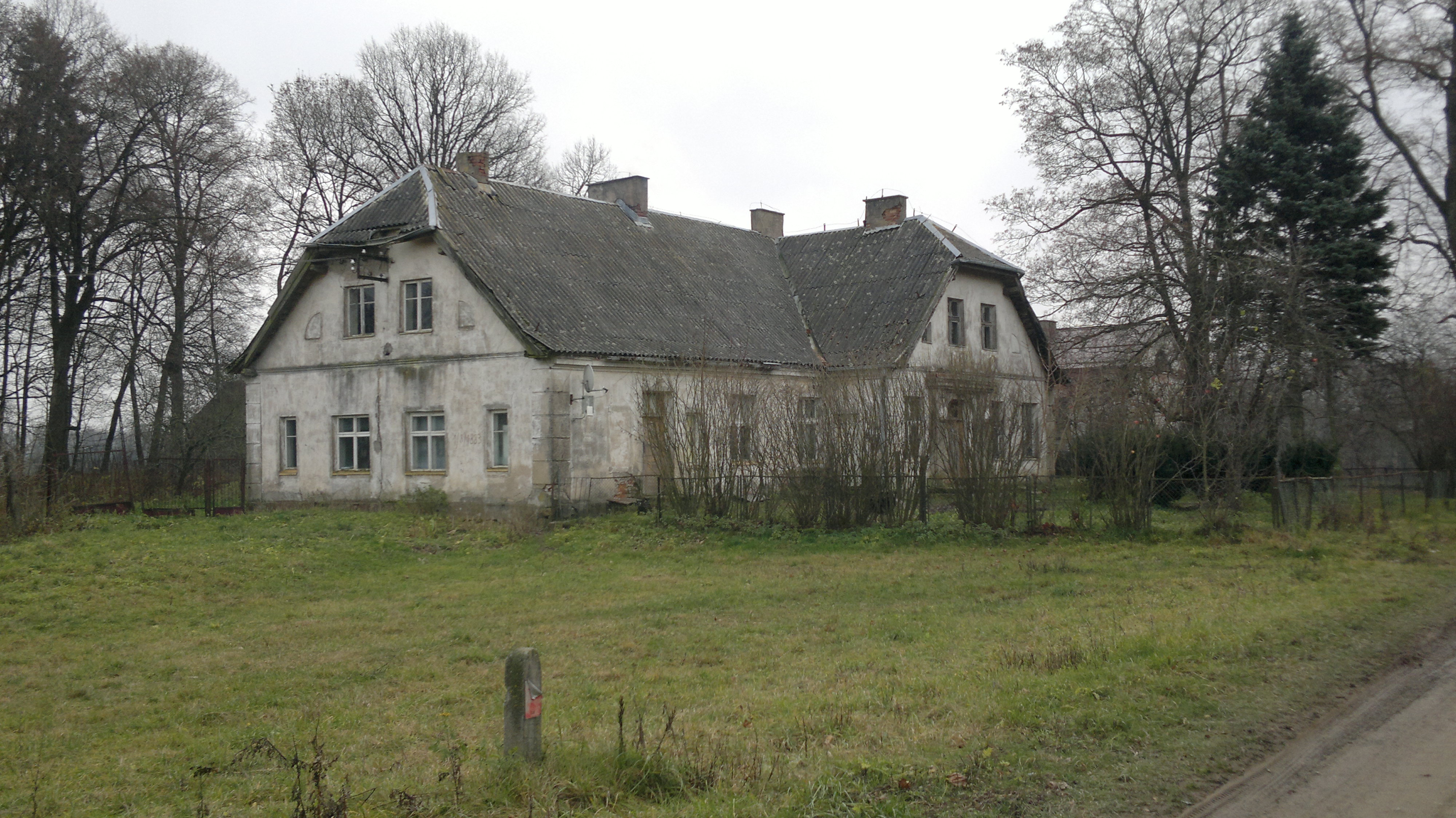
- Manor in Gordejki Małe

- Location within Poland
- Coordinates: 54°03′20″N 22°24′24″E
- Country: Poland
- Voivodeship: Warmian-Masurian
- County: Olecko
- Gmina: Olecko

Gordejki Małe [ɡɔrˈdɛi̯ki ˈmawɛ] is a village in the administrative district of Gmina Olecko, within Olecko County, Warmian-Masurian Voivodeship, in northern Poland.
