= Zielonówek =

- Village
- Location within Poland
- Coordinates: 54°1′55″N 22°27′51″E
- Country: Poland
- Voivodeship: Warmian-Masurian
- County: Olecko
- Gmina: Olecko
- Population: 70

Zielonówek (Note: Pronounced [ʑɛlɔˈnuvɛk]) is a village in the administrative district of Gmina Olecko, within Olecko County, Warmian-Masurian Voivodeship, in northern Poland.
