= Szczecinki =

- Village
- Location within Poland
- Coordinates: 54°4′39″N 22°35′16″E
- Country: Poland
- Voivodeship: Warmian-Masurian
- County: Olecko
- Gmina: Olecko
- Time zone: UTC+1 (CET)
  - Summer (DST): UTC+2 (CEST)
- Vehicle registration: NOE

Szczecinki [ʂt͡ʂɛˈt͡ɕinki] is a village in the administrative district of Gmina Olecko, within Olecko County, Warmian-Masurian Voivodeship, in north-eastern Poland. It is located in Masuria.

Two Polish citizens were murdered by Nazi Germany in the village during World War II.
