= Babki Gąseckie =

- Village
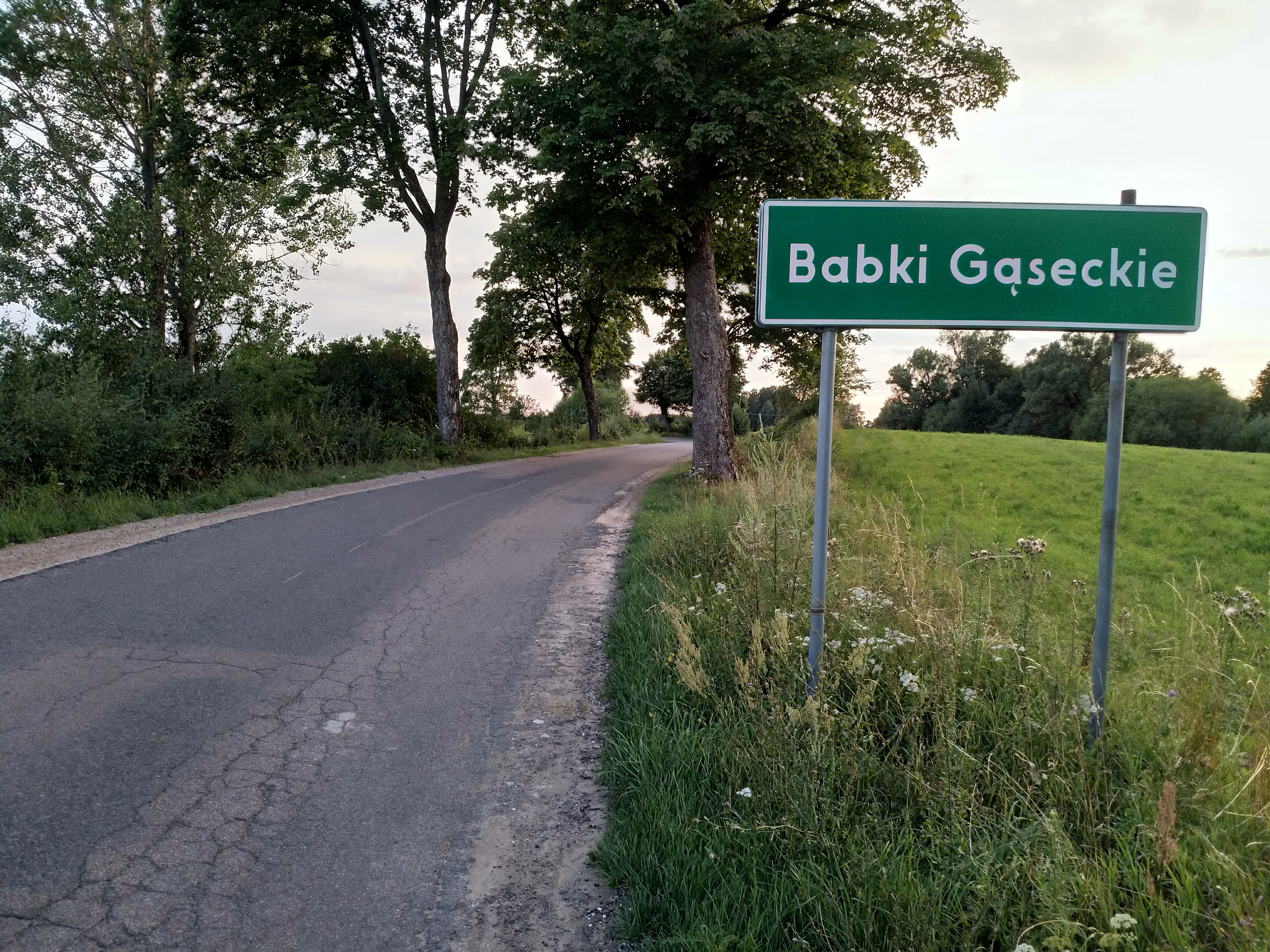

- Location within Poland
- Coordinates: 53°55′N 22°30′E
- Country: Poland
- Voivodeship: Warmian-Masurian
- County: Olecko
- Gmina: Olecko

Babki Gąseckie [ˈbapki ɡɔ̃ˈsɛt͡skʲɛ] is a village in the administrative district of Gmina Olecko, within Olecko County, Warmian-Masurian Voivodeship, in northern Poland.
