= Bartosz Romańczuk =

Polish footballer

Personal information
- Full name: Bartosz Romańczuk
- Date of birth: 28 October 1983 (age 42)
- Place of birth: Olecko, Poland
- Height: 1.75 m (5 ft 9 in)
- Positions: Defender; midfielder

Team information
- Current team: Kłos Gałowo
- Number: 10

Youth career
- 1995–1998: Czarni Olecko
- 1998–2001: MSP Szamotuły

Senior career*
Years	Team	Apps	(Gls)
2001–2002	Lubuszanin Drezdenko		
2002–2003	VfL Wolfsburg	0	(0)
2003–2006	VfL Wolfsburg II	49	(4)
2006–2007	Jagiellonia Białystok	5	(0)
2007–2008	Aias Salamina	32	(11)
2008–2009	Rodos	31	(8)
2009–2010	Panachaiki	20	(5)
2010–2012	ŁKS Łódź	43	(4)
2012–2013	Motor Lublin	13	(0)
2013–2014	1. SC Feucht	41	(2)
2017–	Kłos Gałowo		
- * Club domestic league appearances and goals as of 16:02, 27 June 2025 (UTC)

Bartosz Romańczuk (born 28 October 1983) is a Polish footballer who plays for V liga Greater Poland club Kłos Gałowo.

== Career ==
In June 2010, Romańczuk joined ŁKS Łódź on a one-year contract.

== Honours ==
ŁKS Łódź

- I liga: 2010–11

Kłos Gałowo

- Regional league Greater Poland II: 2023–24
- Polish Cup (Poznań regionals): 2024–25
