= Swider (surname) =

Swider is a surname of Polish-language origin. Notable people with the surname include:

- Cole Swider (born 1999), American basketball player
- Józef Świder (1930–2014), Polish composer
- Larry Swider (1955–2021), American football player
- Mike Swider (born 1955), American football coach
- Nancy Swider-Peltz (born 1956), American speed skater
- Nancy Swider-Peltz Jr. (born 1987), American speed skater

== See also ==
- Świderski
