= Olecko =

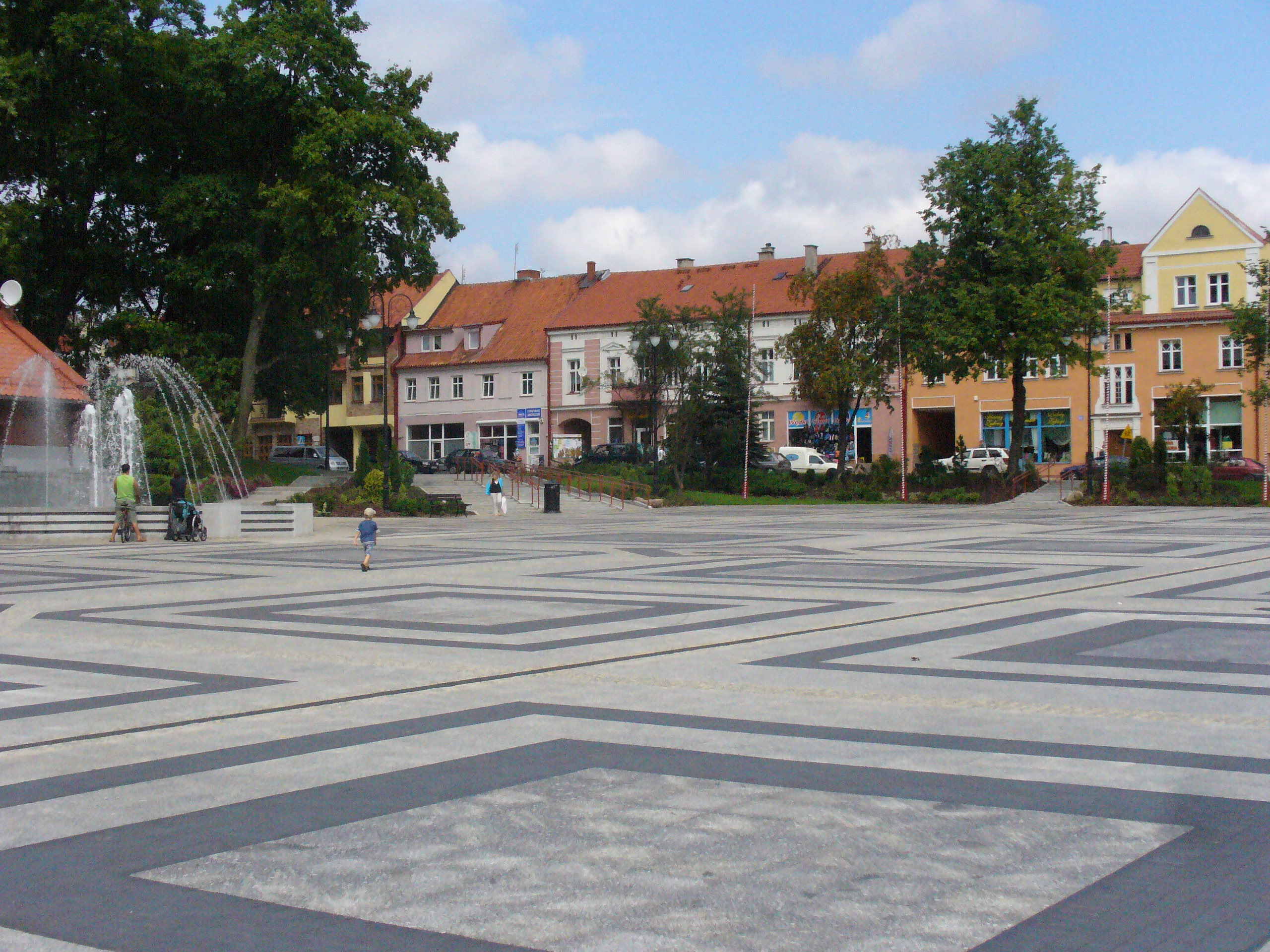
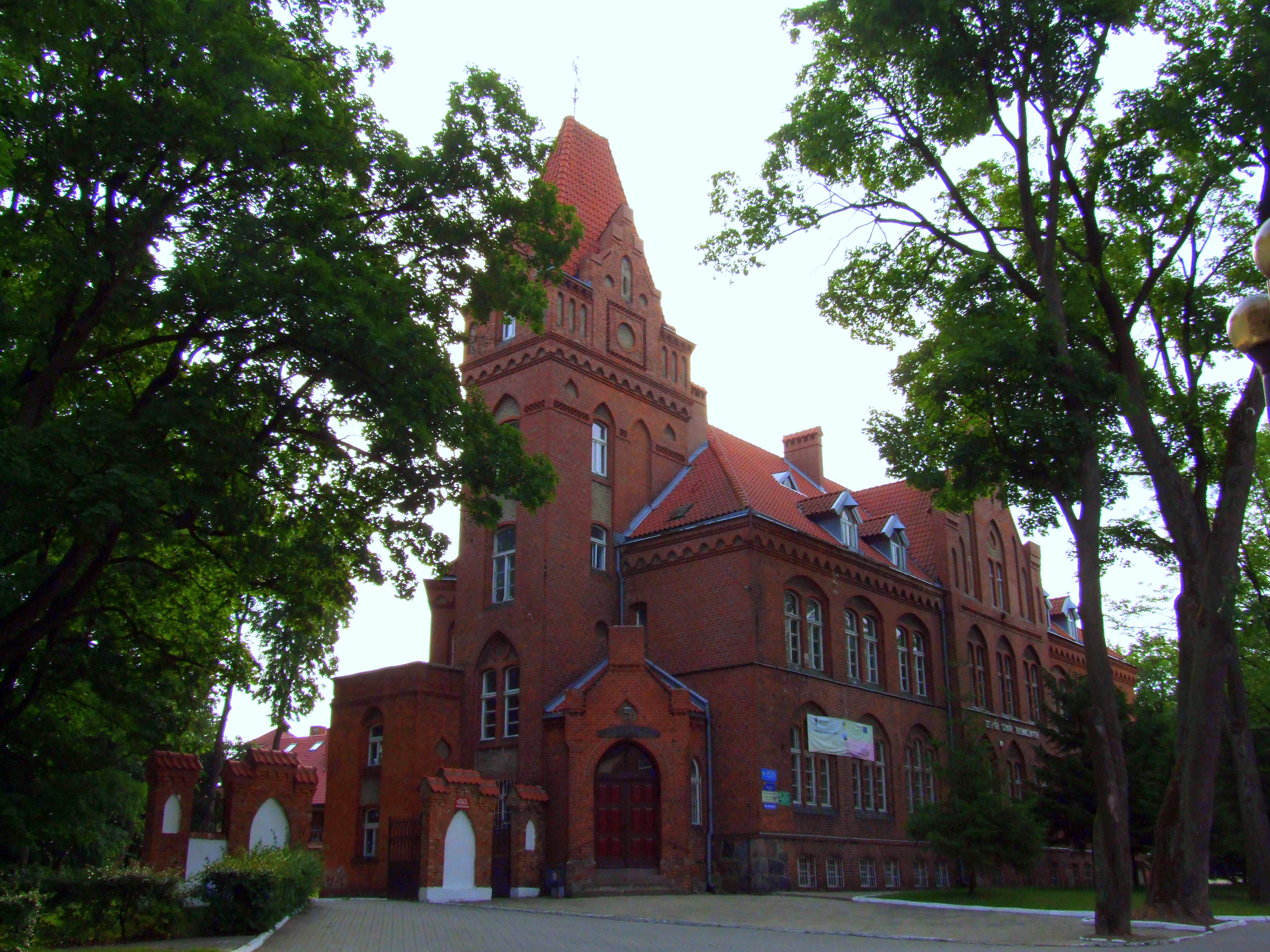
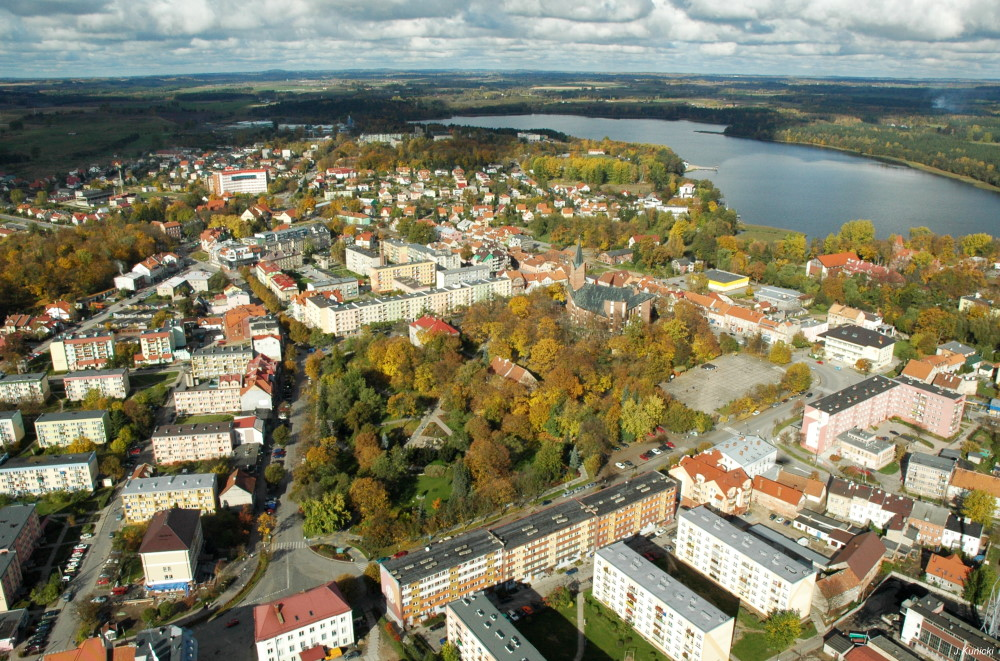
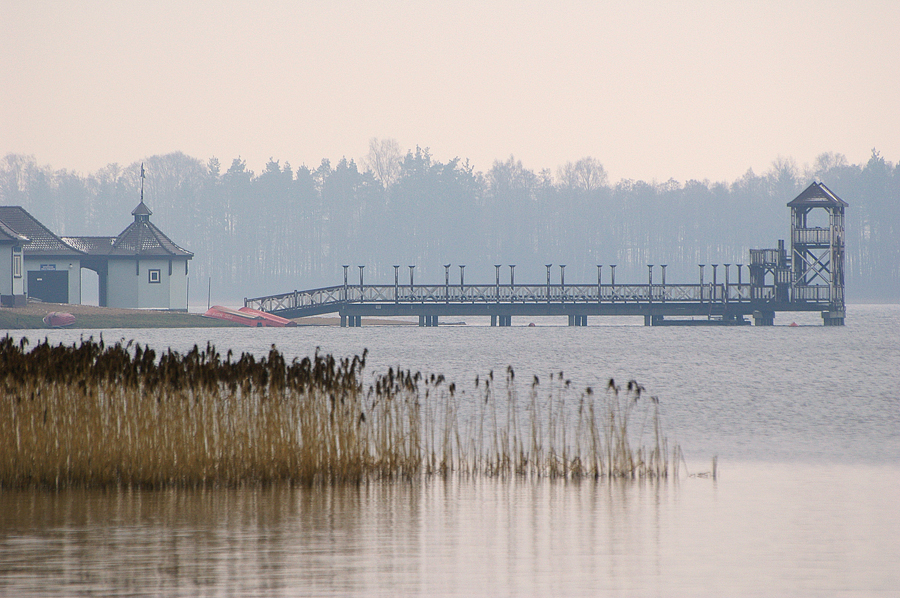
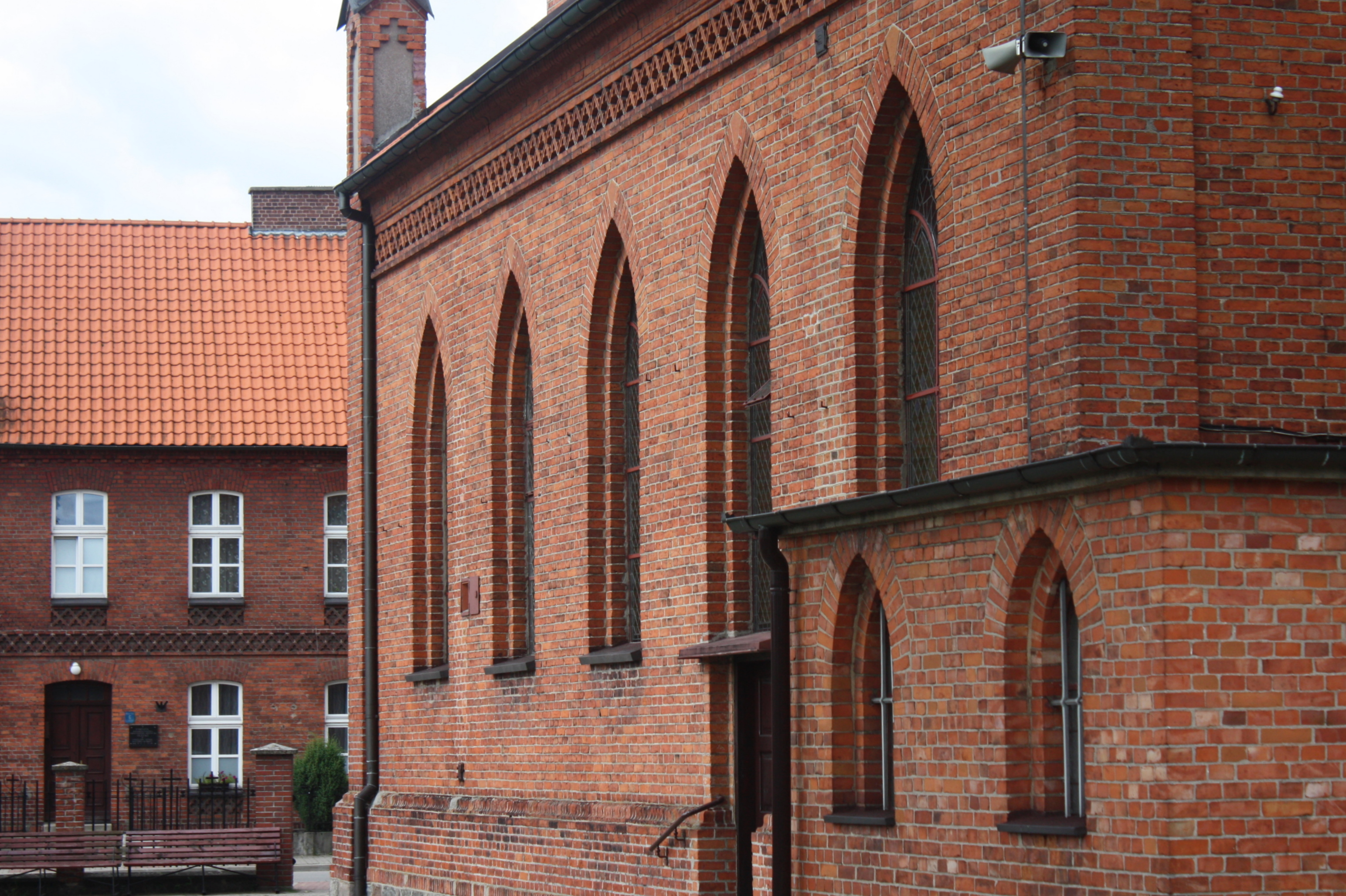
- From top, left to right: Freedom Square; Technical school; Bird's eye view of Olecko; Pier and the Great Olecko Lake; Exaltation of the Holy Cross church

- Flag Coat of arms

- Location within Poland
- Coordinates: 54°2′N 22°30′E
- Country: Poland
- Voivodeship: Warmian-Masurian
- County: Olecko
- Gmina: Olecko
- Established: 16th century
- Town rights: 1560

Government
  - Mayor: Karol Sobczak

Area
  - Total: 11.54 km^{2} (4.46 sq mi)

Population (2024)
  - Total: 15,580
  - Density: 1,350/km^{2} (3,497/sq mi)
- Time zone: UTC+1 (CET)
  - Summer (DST): UTC+2 (CEST)
- Postal code: 19-400 to 19-402
- Area code: +48 87
- Car plates: NOE, NOG
- Website: http://www.olecko.pl

Olecko [ɔˈlɛt͡skɔ] (former German: Marggrabowa since 1560, colloquially also Oletzko, Treuburg since 1928) is a town in northeastern Poland. It is in Masuria, near Ełk and Suwałki, in the Warmian-Masurian Voivodeship. It is at the mouth of the Lega river which flows into the Great Olecko Lake (Jezioro Oleckie Wielkie) on its southwestern shore. Olecko is the seat of Olecko County.

== History ==
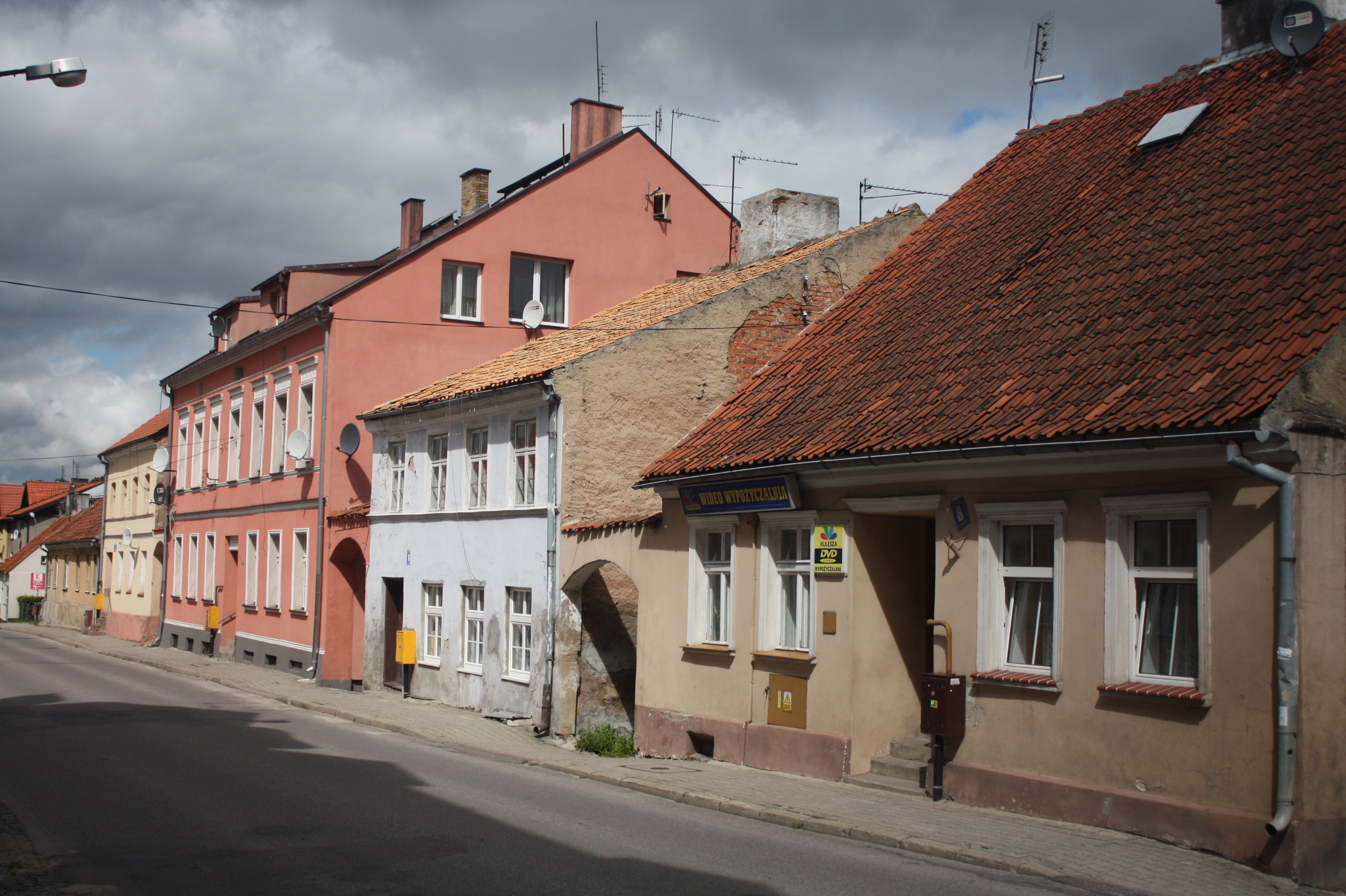
Historic houses in the town centre

Since the 1540s, there was a hunting lodge on the Lega River, soon expanded into a castle, and a settlement, both called Olecko. Margrabowa was founded as a town by Albert, Duke of Prussia, a vassal of Poland, on January 1, 1560. The name was derived from the word Margrabia (Polish for Margrave), the duke's title as the margraviate of Brandenburg-Ansbach's prince, by adding the suffix "-owa", which is typical in Poland for place names derived from personal names and titles. The town's coat of arms still reflects the Brandenburg red eagle and the Hohenzollern black and white which go back to Duke Albert. The town's first wójt was Adam Wojdowski. Wojdowski brought Poles from Mazovia and Masuria to settle the town. Already in 1560, the new residents appointed a town council and municipal court and selected fellow Pole Stanisław Milewski as the first mayor. As of 1600, the population was exclusively Polish. The Poles referred to the town by its older Polish name Olecko. In 1616, the seat of the local starosts was definitively moved from Straduny to Olecko.

The town remained under Polish suzerainty until 1657 when the Duchy of Prussia became independent. In 1701 it became part of the Kingdom of Prussia, and in 1871 part of German Empire. 922 people died during the Great Northern War plague outbreak in 1710. In June 1807, Polish soldiers of General Józef Zajączek took Olecko, then left the town to be replaced by the 2nd Infantry Regiment of Jan Henryk Dąbrowski. Dąbrowski himself visited the town several times. It was believed that both the town and the Masuria region would eventually be part of the restored Polish state after the defeat of Prussia. In June 1812, the IV Cavalry Corps of the French Army with the Polish 4th Light Cavalry Division marched through the town towards Moscow. Between 1818 and 1945, Marggrabowa became the seat of Oletzko County (German: Kreis Oletzko) in the province of East Prussia.

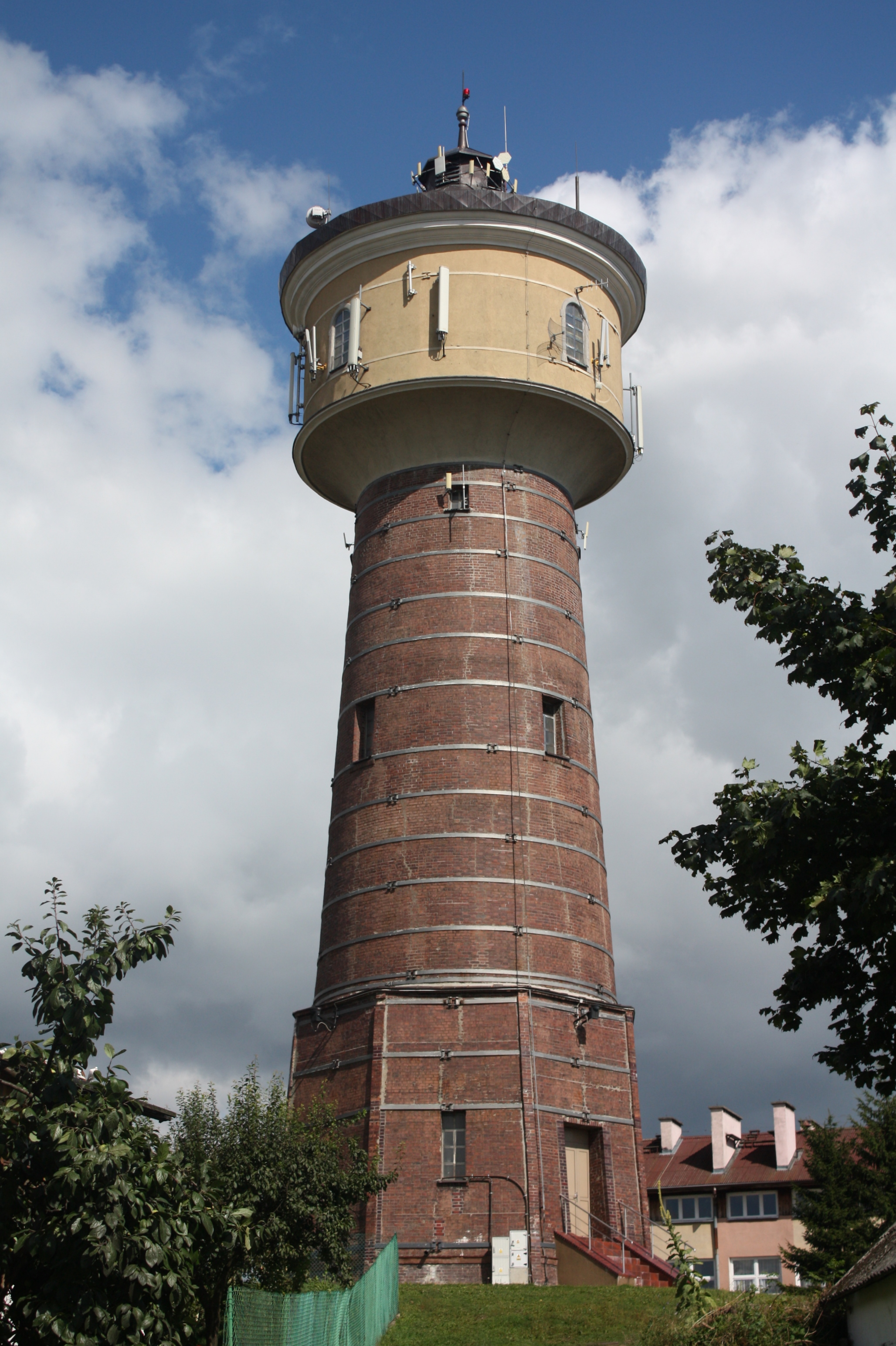
Water tower, built in 1907

From the beginning of the 19th century, the Prussian authorities launched attempts to Germanize the population, as Poles made up 90% of the county's population as of 1818. Germanization at first was pursued because of a fear of Polonization in Masuria since the German languages' status was fragile in the region, but in the aftermath of November Uprising the Prussian government took a more hardline approach, proclaiming that all pupils must learn German in school. In 1836, the local priesthood organized a synod in the town which protested against Germanization policies. The synod's protest was signed by all the pastors in the county, and its arguments were later used by the well-known defenders of the Polish language in Masuria, Gustaw Gizewiusz and Krzysztof Celestyn Mrongovius. The protests were successful, however, the campaign of Germanization was resumed in 1865 and later intensified. As a result, during the second half of the 19th century the proportion of German speakers increased.

During World War I, the city was occupied by the Russian army during the Russian invasion of East Prussia, and then again from 6 November 1914 to 12 February 1915.

In 1920, after Poland regained independent existence following World War I, a plebiscite was to be held in the area by the League of Nations, according to the Treaty of Versailles, to determine the future of the region and the town. In Oletzko, a German mob dispersed a Polish public meeting at the market square and beat up gathered Polish activists. On the day of the plebiscite, July 11, 1920, a crowd of Germans chanting anti-Polish slogans marched to cast their votes. In turn, many Polish supporters boycotted the plebiscite, considering it a farce, and also because they feared German threats of revenge. The plebiscite in the town resulted in 3,903 votes for Germany and none for Poland. As a result, the town was renamed Treuburg (lit.: loyal castle) in 1928.

During World War II, many Poles, but also some Belarusians, Ukrainians and Russians, were enslaved by the Germans as forced labour in the town's vicinity. In the final stages of the war, the Germans forcibly evacuated the town's residents. The abandoned town was captured by the Red Army on January 23, 1945, and afterwards it became again part of Poland under territorial changes promulgated at the Potsdam Conference in July–August 1945. The town was repopulated by Polish settlers, both from nearby Suwałki and Podlachia regions, and from former eastern Poland annexed by the Soviet Union.

In 1949, a dairy and egg cooperative was launched in Olecko, and in 1950, it also began producing cheese.

== Sights ==
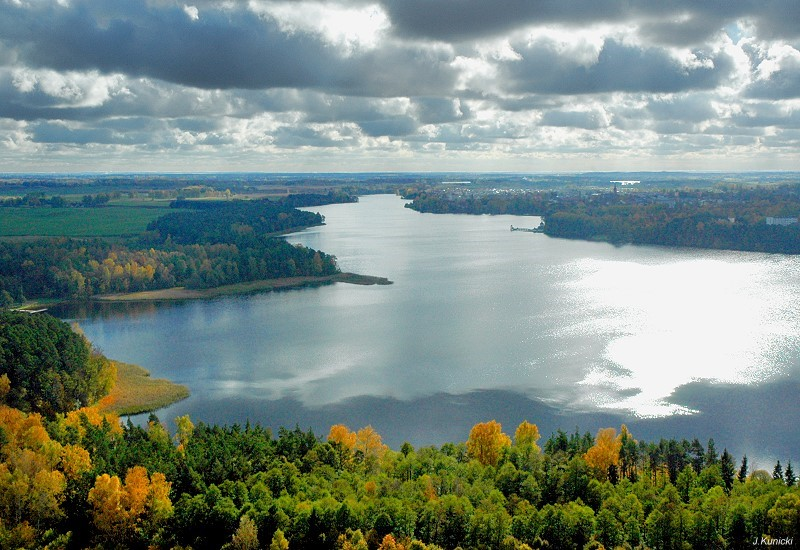
Great Olecko Lake

Plac Wolności (Freedom Square) is one of the largest market squares in Poland. The Our Lady Queen of Poland church is situated on a tree-covered hill in its northern part. Another notable sight is the Oleckie Wielkie Lake with a promenade, a municipal beach and preserved historic pier.

== Transport ==
National road 65 bypasses Olecko to the west.

The Olecko train station in the western part of town is a regional railway junction: there were main lines to Gołdap, Ełk and Suwałki. The local railway connections to Mieruniszki, Kruklanki and Sulejki are out of service or dismantled. Currently, only bus services run from the train station.

== Culture ==
The main cultural institution of Olecko is the "Mazury Garbate" Regional Cultural Center with its cinema, theater, etc. Miejsko-Powiatowa Biblioteka Publiczna is the main public library of the town.

Olecko hosts the annual festivals Przystanek Olecko, which includes mostly rock acts, and Mazurskie Spotkania z Folklorem ("Masurian Meetings with Folklore"), dedicated to folk music with performers from Poland and various other countries.

The Olecko Milk and Honey Festival, an annual fair dedicated to milk and honey products, is held in August, in reference to local traditions of milk, dairy and honey production. The honey of Olecko land, which comes in several varieties, i.e. multi-flower honey, linden honey, rapeseed honey, forest honey, buckwheat honey, and honeydew honey, is an officially protected traditional food of the Olecko County, as designated by the Ministry of Agriculture and Rural Development of Poland.

== Sports ==
The town's leading sport club is Czarni Olecko with football, handball, table tennis and chess sections. Other clubs include athletics club Korab Olecko, shooting club Wilk Olecko and women's volleyball club Perła Olecka.

== Education ==
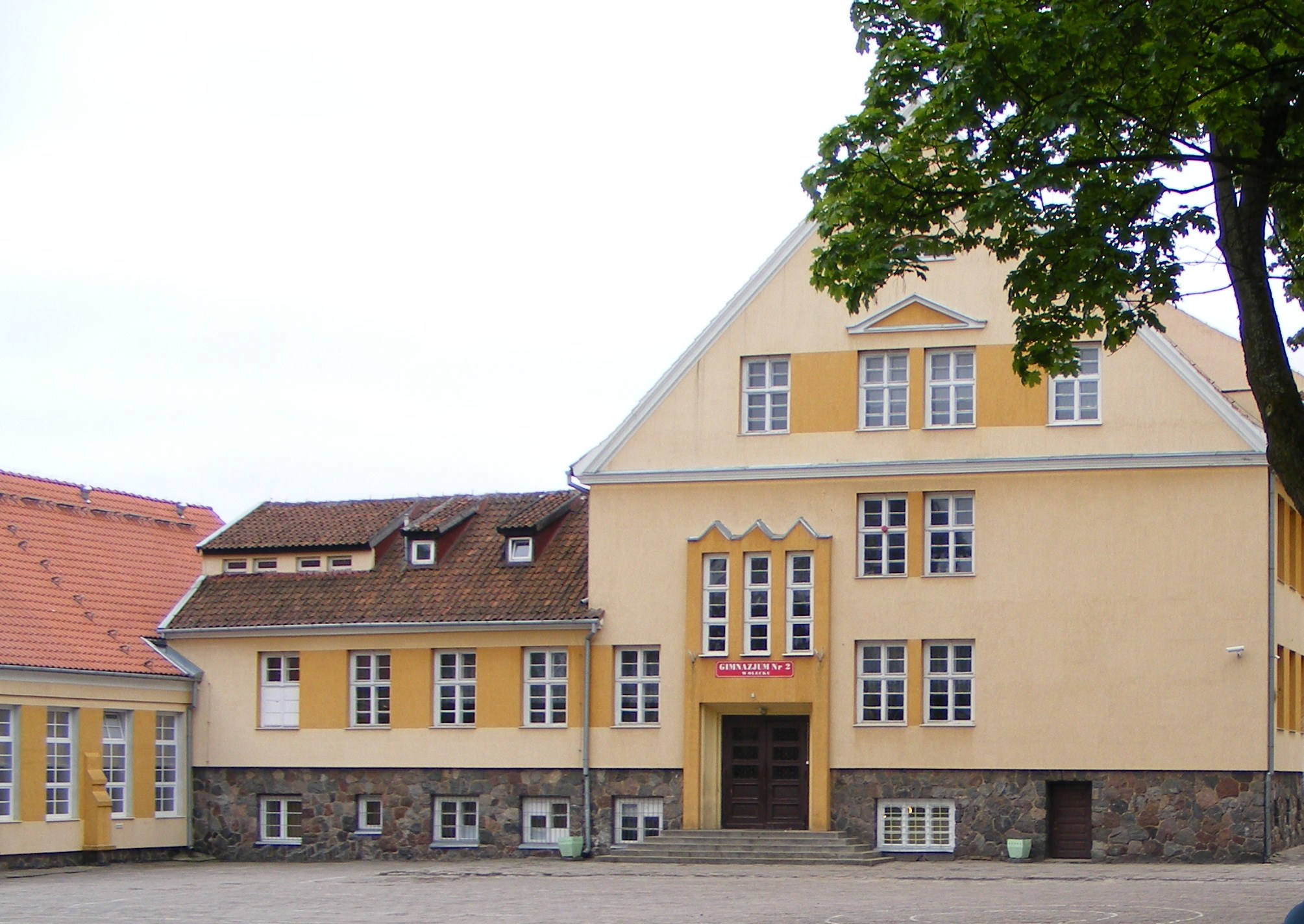
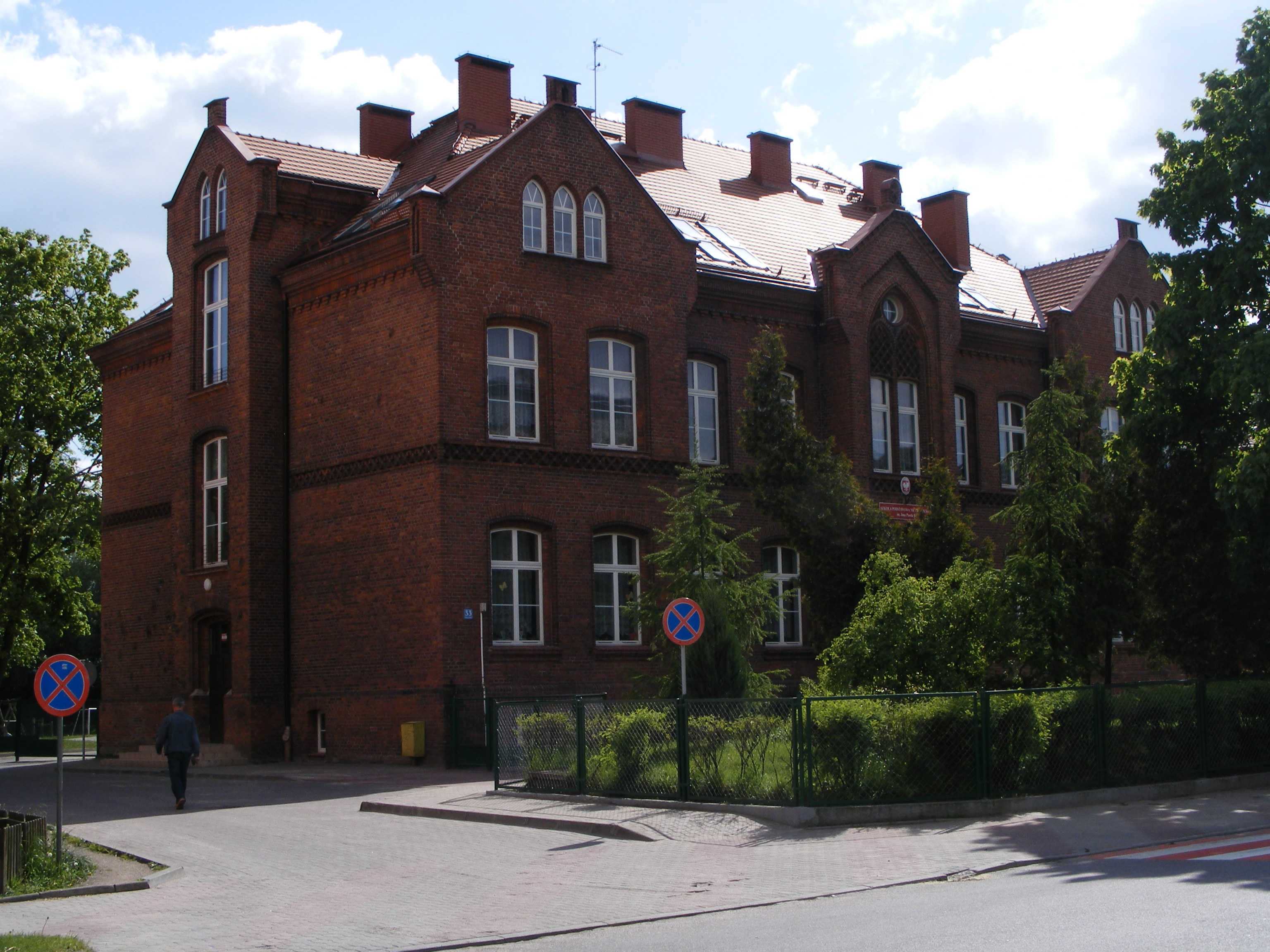
Elementary schools No. 2 and 3
- Liceum Ogólnokształące im. Jana Kochanowskiego (high school)
- Technical Schools Complex (high school)
- Liceum and Vocational School Complex (high school)
- St. Filippo Smaldone School and Educational Center for Deaf Children (high school and elementary school)
- Henryk Sienkiewicz Elementary School No. 1
- Nicolaus Copernicus Elementary School No. 2
- John Paul II Elementary School No. 3
- Jan Twardowski Elementary School No. 4
- Social Elementary School of the Social Educational Society (private)

== Notable residents ==
- Gustav Bergenroth (1813–1869), German historian
- Kurt Blumenfeld (1884–1963), Zionist
- Arthur Zimmermann (1864–1940), diplomat, author of the Zimmermann Telegram
- Filip Jan Rymsza (born 1977), Polish-American filmmaker and writer
- Bartosz Romańczuk (born 1983), Polish footballer

== International relations ==
Olecko is a member of Cittaslow.

=== Twin towns — sister cities ===
Olecko is twinned with:

- Jõhvi, Estonia

== See also ==
- Możanka
