= Karol Sobczak =

Polish politician and footballer

Personal information
- Date of birth: 27 February 1972 (age 54)
- Place of birth: Olecko, Poland
- Height: 1.79 m (5 ft 10 in)
- Position: Midfielder

Youth career
- –1988: Wigry Suwałki

Senior career*
Years	Team	Apps	(Gls)
1988–1989	Wigry Suwałki		
1989–1995	Lechia Gdańsk	143	(18)
1995–1997	Polonia Warsaw		
1997–1999	Hetman Zamość		
2000–2001	Górnik Łęczna		
- * Club domestic league appearances and goals

Karol Sobczak (born 27 February 1972) is a Polish politician who is the mayor of Olecko. Before starting a career in politics, he was a football player, manager, and educator.

== Biography ==
Karol Sobczak

Mayor of Olecko
- In office 23 November 2018 – Incumbent

Personal details
- Born: 27 February 1972 (age 54) Olecko, Poland

Sobczak was born in Olecko in 1972. He started his career with Wigry Suwałki's youth teams, progressing to the first team for the 1988–89 season. In 1989 he joined Lechia Gdańsk, spending six seasons with the club. In total, he made 151 appearances in all competitions and scored 19 goals, with most of his appearances coming in II liga. During the winter transfer window, Sobczak joined Polonia Warsaw, winning the league and being promoted to Ekstraklasa in his first season. Sobczak made 5 top-tier appearances as Polonia struggled and ended up being relegated back to second-tier. In the final years of his career, Sobczak played for Hetman Zamość and Górnik Łęczna. Sobczak retired from playing football in 2001 aged 29.

In 1997, he graduated from the Academy of Physical Education in Gdańsk with a master's degree in physical education with a view of what he wanted to do after his playing career. He used his degree when he started working in a school as a PE teacher. He also achieved a 1st class in football coaching. In 2001, Sobczak started working as a footballing coach, working with Czarni Olecko, Płomień Ełk and Unia Olecko and winning promotions with each of the three clubs.

Sobczak was a councilor in Olecko for 12 years, and became its mayor on 23 November 2018.
