= Świdry, Olecko County =

Świdry
- Village
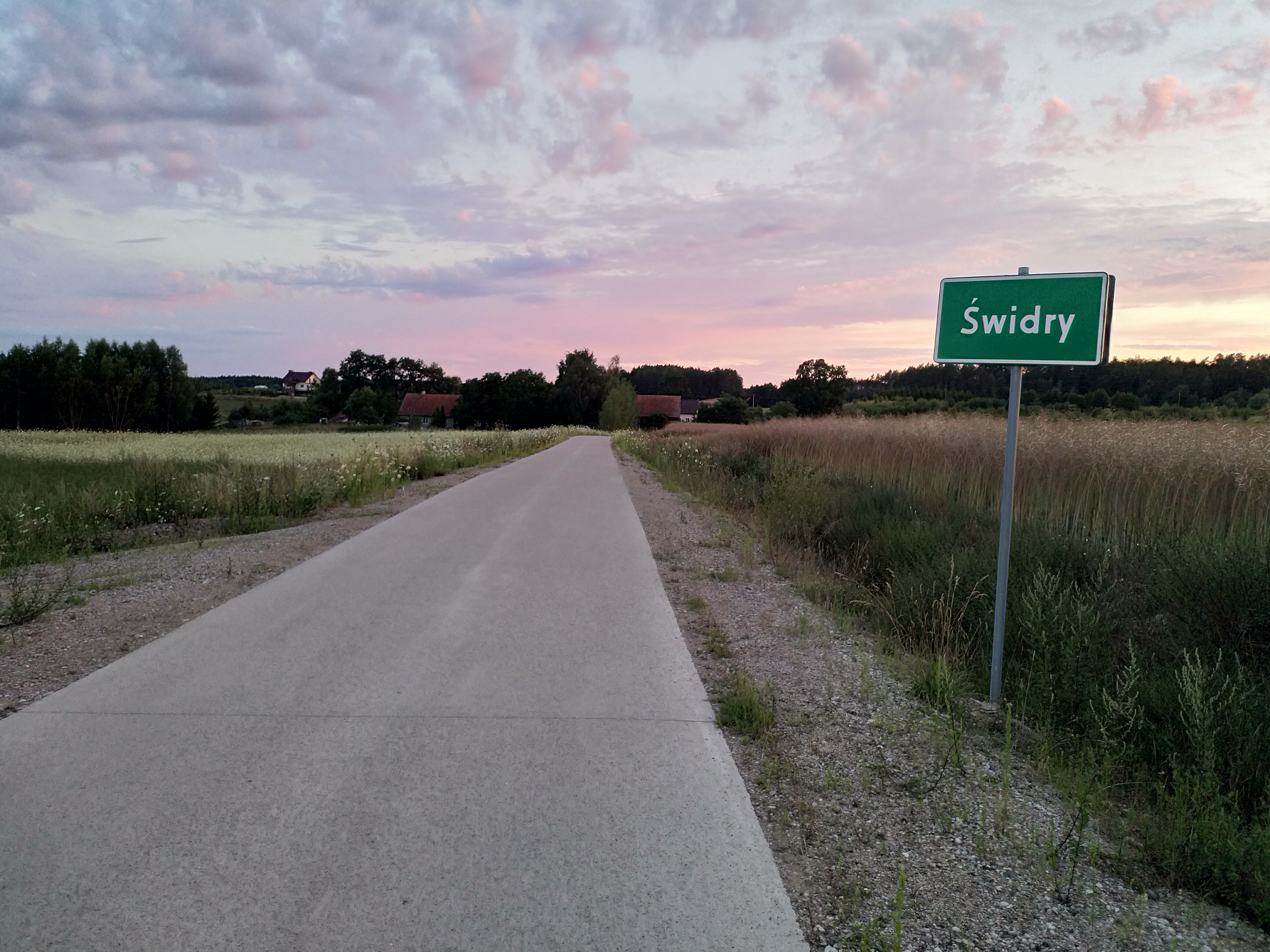

- Location within Poland
- Coordinates: 53°55′N 22°27′E
- Country: Poland
- Voivodeship: Warmian-Masurian
- County: Olecko
- Gmina: Olecko

Świdry (Polish: [ˈɕfidrɨ]) is a village in the administrative district of Gmina Olecko, within Olecko County, Warmian-Masurian Voivodeship, in northern Poland.
