= Pieńki, Warmian-Masurian Voivodeship =

Pieńki
- Settlement
- Location within Poland
- Coordinates: 54°5′N 22°32′E
- Country: Poland
- Voivodeship: Warmian-Masurian
- County: Olecko
- Gmina: Olecko

Pieńki [ˈpjɛɲki] is a settlement in the administrative district of Gmina Olecko, within Olecko County, Warmian-Masurian Voivodeship, in northern Poland.
