= Zajdy =

- Village
- Location within Poland
- Coordinates: 53°59′N 22°26′E
- Country: Poland
- Voivodeship: Warmian-Masurian
- County: Olecko
- Gmina: Olecko

Zajdy [ˈzai̯dɨ] (German: Saiden) is a village in the administrative district of Gmina Olecko, within Olecko County, Warmian-Masurian Voivodeship, in northern Poland.
