= 1938 changing of place names in East Prussia =

Nazi-era replacement of toponyms in East Prussia

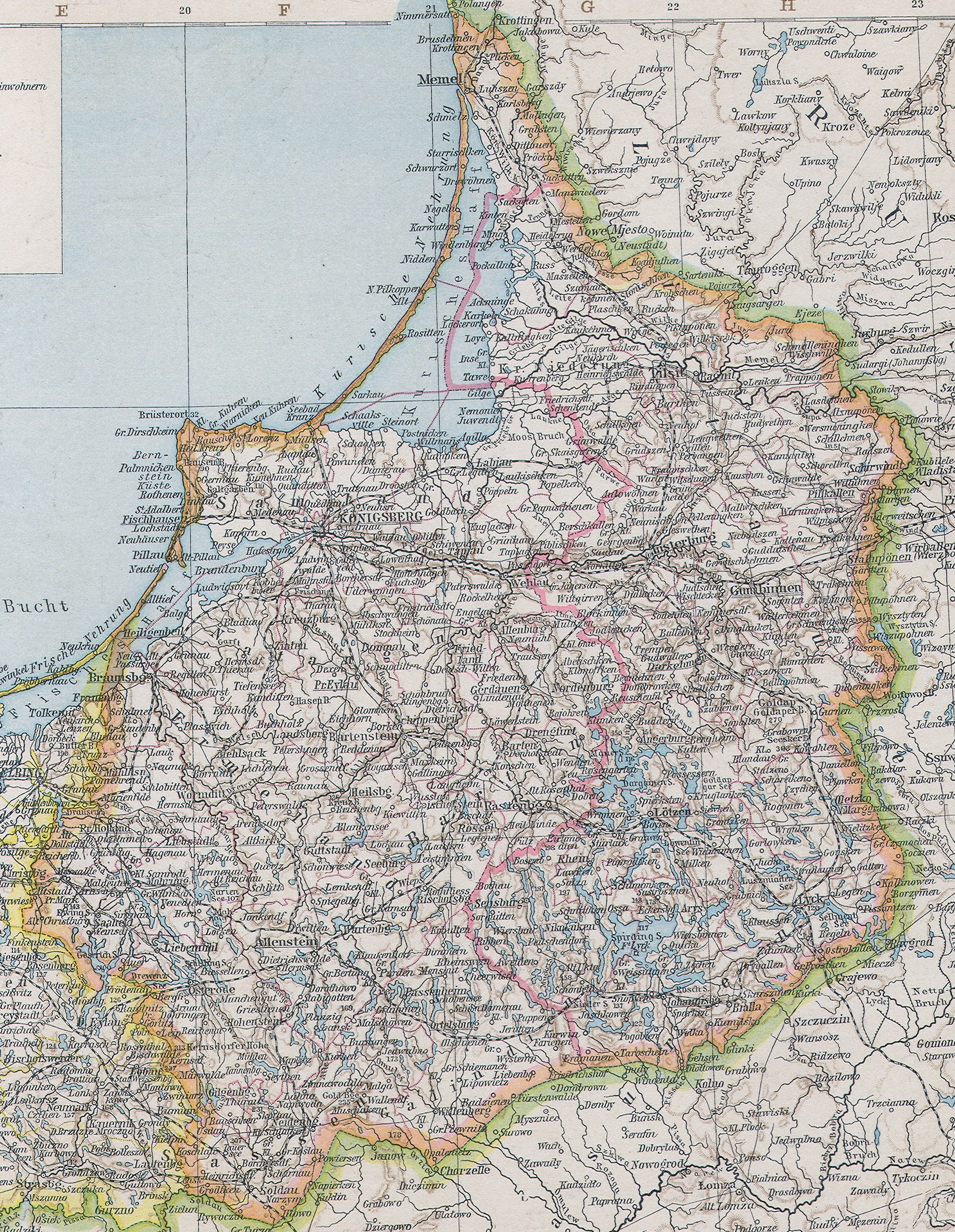
- A map of East Prussia in 1890 with many of the original place names
- Native name: Umbenennung von Orten in Ostpreußen im Jahr 1938
- Date: July 16, 1938
- Location: East Prussia
- Type: Geographical renaming
- Cause: Germanisation
- Organised by: Prussian Ministry of Science, Education and People's Education (Ministerium für Wissenschaft, Erziehung und Volksbildung)

On 16 July 1938, more than 1500 place names in East Prussia were changed, following a decree issued by Gauleiter and Oberpräsident Erich Koch and initiated by Adolf Hitler. Most of the names affected were of Old Prussian, Lithuanian and Polish origin; they were either eliminated, Germanized, or simplified. Similar geographical renaming also took place in other parts of Nazi Germany.

== History ==
Place names in Masuria were occasionally changed prior to 1938, and even before the Nazi era. In the district of Lötzen 47 percent of all villages had already been renamed in the Weimar Republic and another 36 percent after 1933. A systematic renaming campaign was prepared after Koch issued the corresponding order on 25 August 1937. (Note: The order was republished by the Publikationsstelle Berlin-Dahlem (PuSte) and is now in the Federal German Archives (Bundesarchiv Berlin), R 153/390: "Erfassung slawischer Ortsnamen im deutschen Reichsgebiet und Pläne zur Umbenennung dieser Orte in deutsche Namen", includes: Oberpräsident Ostpreußen, Königsberg, 25. 8. 1937, betr.: Verdeutschung fremdsprachiger Namen in Ostpreußen, Bezug: Erlaß des Reichs- und Preußischen Minister des Innern vom 6. 7. 1937; cf. Kossert (2003), p. 138.) Following this order, the Prussian Ministry of Science, Education and People's Education (Ministerium für Wissenschaft, Erziehung und Volksbildung) set up an expert commission led by the ministerial adviser (Ministerialrat) Heinrich Harmjanz. Other members of the commission included Slavicist Karl Heinrich Meyer, Germanist Walther Ziesemer, Lithuanian and Old Prussian place name specialist Viktor Falkenhahn and the director of the Prussian State Archive Königsberg and Teutonic Order state place name specialist Max Hein. Affected were names of villages, water bodies, forests and cadastral districts. In some counties up to 70% of the place names had been changed by 16 July 1938.

After World War II the local German populace fled or was expelled. In the part of East Prussia that was given to Poland and became the Warmian–Masurian Voivodeship the modern Polish place names were determined by the Commission for the Determination of Place Names, which generally restored the pre-1938 place names, in the case of German-origin place names without a Polish alternative simply translating them from German into Polish. In the northern part of East Prussia that was given to the Soviet Union and became Kaliningrad Oblast, no historical Russian place names could be found and the Soviet government was unwilling to restore the old Lithuanian or old Polish place names, therefore entirely new names were invented. In the case of major oblast towns, half of them were named after Russian and Soviet military leaders. The place names invented in 1938 by the government of Nazi Germany still remain in official use in Germany.

== Examples of changed place names ==
Pre-1938 place name	New place name	Polish spelling	Lithuanian spelling	Notes
Abscherningken	Ebershagen	Abszerzynki	Opšrininkai	
Aschlauken	Kalkhöfen	Aszłuki	Ašlaukai	
Babken	Lagenquell	Babki Oleckie	Babkonys	Modern-day Babki Oleckie, Poland.
Bittkowen	Bittkau	Bitkowo	Bitkavas	Modern-day Bitkowo, Gołdap County, Poland.
Budweitschen	Altenwacht	Darkiejmy	Budvaičiai	
Darkehmen	Angerapp	Darkiejmy	Darkiemis	Modern-day Ozyorsk, Kaliningrad Oblast, Russia.
Dombrowsken	Königsruh	Dąbrowskie	Dombrovskė	Modern-day Dąbrowskie, Olecko County, Poland.
Dobawen	Dobauen	Dobawno	Dobavė	
Dubeninken	Dubeningen	Dubeninki	Dubeninkai	Modern-day Dubeninki, Poland.
Drosdowen	Drosten	Drozdowo	Dieveniškės	
Duttken	Sargensee	Dudki	Dudkai	
Elluschönen	Ellern	Pięknoelusz	Eliušėnai	Modern-day Sadovoye, Chistye Prudy rural settlement, Russia.
Germingkehmen	Germingen	Germinów	Germinkiemis	
Gertschen	Gertenau	Gerczyn	Gerčiai	Modern-day Yarovoye, Kaliningrad Oblast, Russia.
Gollubien	Unterfelde	Gollubin	Gollubai	Modern-day Golubie, Gołdap County, Poland.
Grabowen	Arnswald	Grabowo	Grabava	Modern-day Grabowo, Gołdap County, Poland.
Gr. Grigalischken	Ellerbach	Wielkie Grigalinki	Didieji Grigalai	
Gr. Rominten	Hardteck	Rominty Wielkie	Rominta	Modern-day Krasnolesye, Russia.
Gr. Schwentischken	Schanzenort	Wielkie Śwenciszki	Didieji Šventiškiai	Modern-day Pugachevo, Nesterovsky District, Russia.
Gr. Schakummen	Eichkamp	Wielkie Szakuminy	Didieji Šakumonys	
Kl. Grigalischken	Kleinkalkhöfen	Małe Grigalinki	Mažieji Grigalai	
Kl. Lassek	Liebchensruh	Małe Lasek	Mažieji Lasekai	
Kl. Schwentischken	Kleinschanzenort	Małe Śwenciszki	Mažieji Šventiškiai	
Kowahlen	Reimannswalde	Kowale Oleckie	Kovalai	
Krajutkehmen	Dürrfelde	Krajutkiemy	Krajutkiemis	
Kuiken	Albrechtsrode	Kwik	Kuikiai	
Kukowen	Reinkental	Kukowo	Kukovai	
Kulligkehmen	Ohldorf	Kuliky	Kulikiemis	
Makunischken	Hohenwaldeck	Makuniszki	Makūniškiai	Modern-day Tokarevka, Kaliningrad Oblast, Russia.
Mehlkehmen	Birkenmühle	Mielkiny	Mielkiemis	Modern-day Kalinino, Kaliningrad Oblast, Russia.
Meldienen	Gnadenheim	Meldyniai	Meldynai	
Mierunsken	Merunen	Mieruniszki	Mėrūniškiai	
Naujeningken	Neuhufen	Naujeninki	Naujininkai	Modern-day Khutorskoye, Kaliningrad Oblast, Russia.
Neuteich	Damerau	Nowe Stawy	Naičiai	
Oszeningken	Pfalzrode	Ożynki	Ožininkai	Modern-day Karpinskoye, Russia.
Pablindszen	Zollteich	Pobłędzie	Pablindžiai	Modern-day Pobłędzie, Poland.
Perkallen	Husarenberg	Perkaliny	Perkaliai	
Plautzkehmen	Engern	Pluszkiejmy	Pliuškemis	Modern-day Pluszkiejmy, Poland.
Pöwgallen	Pöwen	Pewgalia	Pievgaliai	
Pillupönen	Schloßbach	Pilupiony	Pilupėnai	
Ribbenischken	Ribbenau	Rybieniszki	Ribiniškiai	Modern-day Uvarovo, Kaliningrad Oblast, Russia.
Samelucken	Sameln, Brückental	Samalukai	Samalukai	
Samonienen	Gut Reiterhof	Samonieny	Samanynai	Modern-day Dokuchaevo, Kaliningrad Oblast, Russia.
Sayden	Saiden	Zajdy	Zajdai	Modern-day Zajdy, Poland.
Schmulken	Birkenhöhe	Szmulki	Šmulkeniai	
Schönbruch	Damerau	Piękny Bruch	Šonbrūkas	
Stallupönen	Ebenrode	Stalupiany	Stalupėnai	Modern-day Nesterov, Russia.
Stooßnen	Stosnau	Stożne	Stošnai	
Suleyken	Suleiken	Sulejki	Suleykai	Modern-day Sulejki, Poland.
Szittkehmen	Judendorf	Żytkiejmy	Žydkiemis	Modern-day Żytkiejmy, Poland. The name literally means "Jewish village".
Szurgupchen	Sprindort	Szurgupki	Žirgučiai	
Tellitzkehmen	Tellrode	Telliczki	Telyčkiemis	
Tollmingkehmen	Tollmingen	Tolmingiany	Tolminkiemis	Modern-day Chistye Prudy, Kaliningrad Oblast, Russia.
Walterkehmen	Großwaltersdorf	Walterkiemy	Valtarkiemis	Modern-day Olchovatka, Kaliningrad Oblast, Russia.
Wilkoschen	Wolfseck	Wilkosze	Vilkošiai	

== In other regions ==
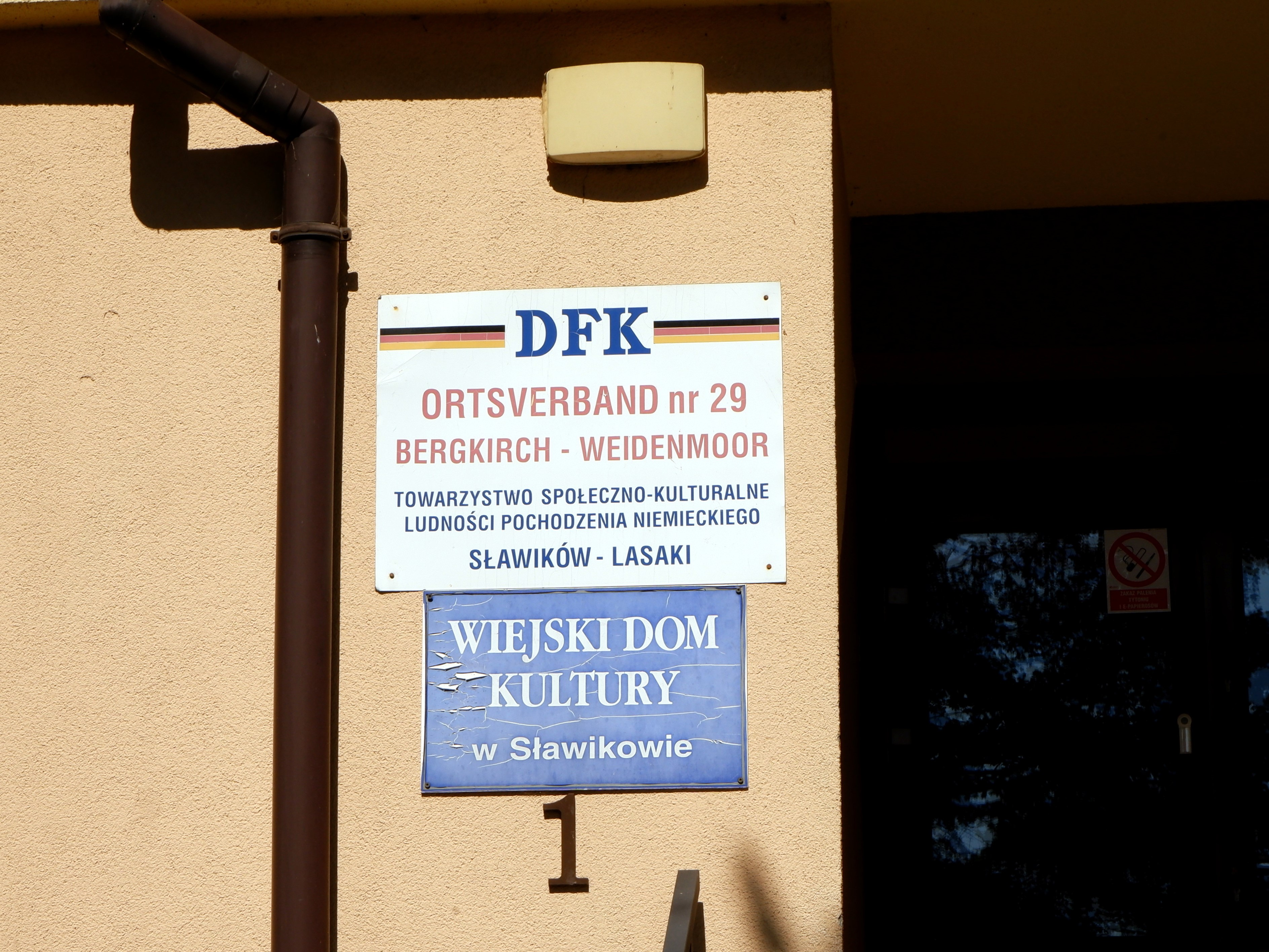
Contemporary signboard of the German minority community centre in Sławików, Racibórz County, with the place names Bergkirch and Weidenmoor implemented in 1936 instead of Slawikau and Lassoky

A similar replacement of place names was carried out in other regions of Nazi Germany, especially in Silesia. There, 1088 place names in the Oppeln region were changed in 1936, also 359 in the Breslau (Wroclaw) area and 178 in the Liegnitz (Legnica) area between 1937 and 1938. In the portion of Upper Silesia which after World War I had become part of the Second Polish Republic, most places had two locally used names, a German one and a Polish one, and after 1922, Polish authorities made the Polish variants the official names.

During World War II, renaming occurred primarily in occupied/annexed territories, because the Nazi government felt that "foreign language names for places constitute a national threat and may lead to mistaken world opinion in regard to their nationality". Areas affected included Polish areas annexed by Nazi Germany, e.g. Upper Silesia and the area near Poznań, and Alsace, as well as Czechoslovakia.

== See also ==
- German exonyms (Kaliningrad Oblast)
- List of cities and towns in East Prussia
