= Janina Kraupe-Świderska =

Polish painter and printmaker

Janina Kraupe-Świderska (27 January 1921 – 3 March 2016) was a Polish painter and printmaker. A native of Sosnowiec, Kraupe-Świderska was associated for much of her career with the avant-garde of Kraków, especially the group which had formed around the city's Kunstgewerbeschule during World War II; eventually she numbered Tadeusz Kantor, Tadeusz Brzozowski, Kazimierz Mikulski, and Jerzy Nowosielski among her acquaintances. From 1957 she belonged to the Grupa Krakowska. She studied at the Academy of Fine Arts, Kraków, eventually returning to the institution as a lecturer and professor and remaining on the faculty until 1980. A 1997 print by Kraupe-Świderska is owned by the National Gallery of Art, and she is represented in the collection of the Olomouc Museum of Art.
