= Lega (river) =

River in Poland

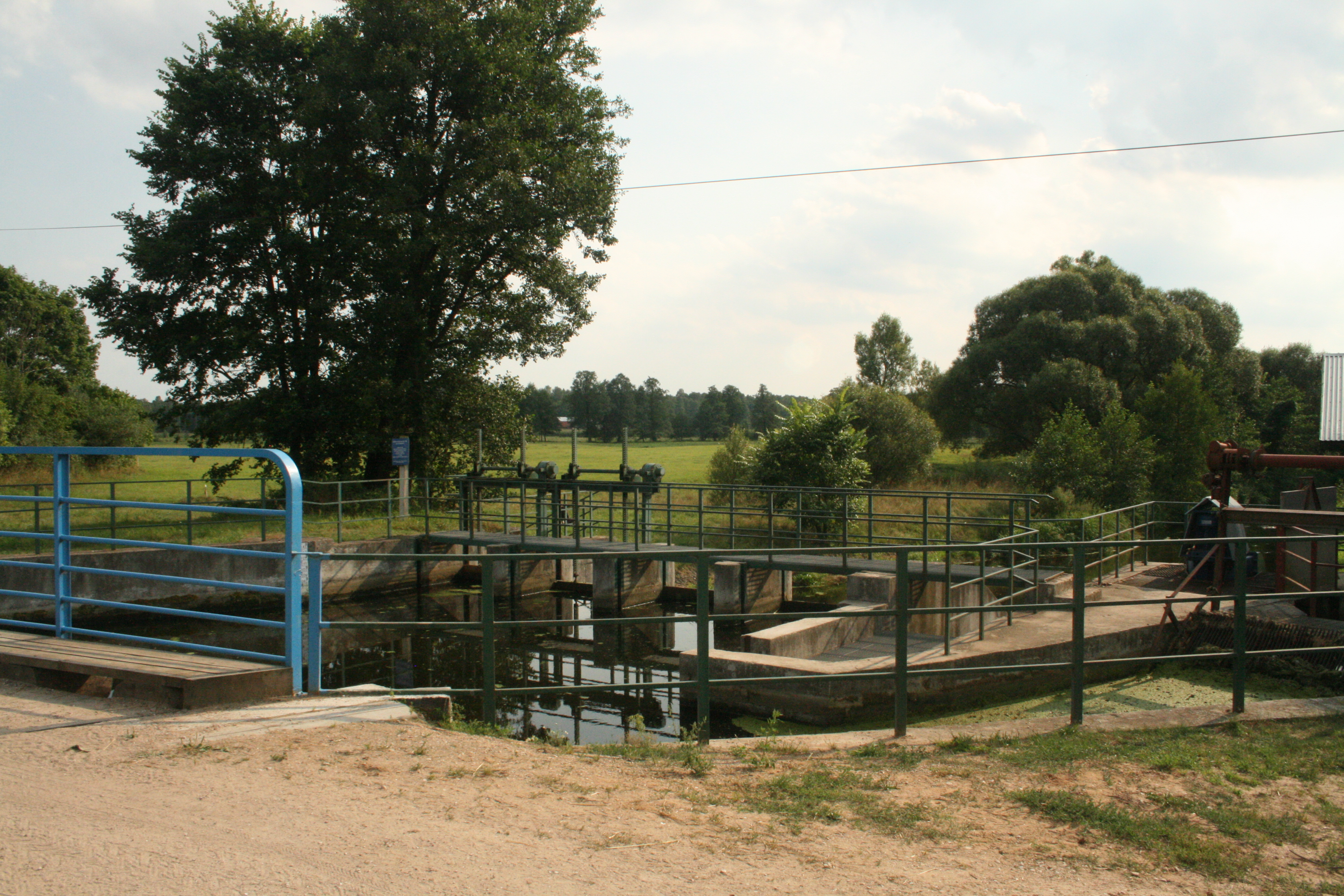

Location
- Country: Poland

Physical characteristics
- Mouth
  - location: Biebrza
  - coordinates: 53.5207°N 22.8028°E
- Length: 157 km (98 mi)
- Discharge
  - location: 53.80287°N 22.54572°E

Basin features
- Progression: Biebrza→ Narew→ Vistula→ Baltic Sea

Lega is a river in Poland, a right tributary of the river Biebrza. It flows through a number of lakes on the border of the Warmian-Masurian and Podlaskie Voivodeships. Its source is near the village of Szarejki.

== Geography ==
It passes through the Great Olecko Lake and the Small Olecko Lake at Olecko, and flows into the lake Selmęt Wielki east of Ełk. At the outlet of this lake its name changes in many mappings, but its course in the lake may be shown. It continues to the lake Stackie, which is connected with the lake Rajgrodzkie, under the name Małkiń. It flows out of Rajgrodzkie at Rajgród, and continues under the name Jegrznia. It passes through the lake Dręstwo and flows into the Biebrza near Goniądz.
