= Zdzisław Świderski =

Polish professor

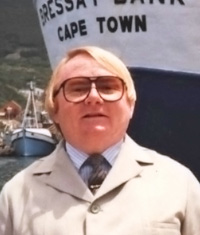
Zdzisław Świderski

Zdzisław Piotr Świderski (born April 29, 1940 in Pruszków, Poland) is a Polish professor and Head of Department Reproductive & Developmental Biology of Parasites in Witold Stafanski Institute of Parasitology, Polish Academy of Sciences in Warsaw, Poland. He is known for major studies on the reproductive biology and ultrastructure and cytochemistry of embryogenesis, spermatogenesis and vitellogenesis of cestodes and trematodes.

Swiderski completed his high school education in Pruszków, Poland and obtained his maturity diploma in 1958 at Tomasz Zan High School. Shortly thereafter he entered University of Warsaw where he completed his M.Sc. degree in biology/zoology in 1964 with a thesis "Cytological and cytochemical studies on oogenesis in oak silkworm Antherea pernyi Guerin-Meneville (Lepidoptera)", which was published in "Zoologica Poloniae".

During 1964–1968 he worked his way up to senior research assistant at the Witold Stefański Institute of Parasitology in Warsaw. Later he emigrated to Switzerland, where during 1968–1983 and 1988–1993 he also worked at the University of Geneva in the Department of Comparative Anatomy and Physiology as senior research assistant and later as Chef de Travaux or head of research projects. He became a Ph.D. student at the University and in 1972 obtained his doctor's degree for his Ph.D. thesis "La structure fine de l'oncosphere du cestode Catenotaenia pusilla Goeze, 1782)", later published in the journal "La Cellule".

At the end of 1983, he took part in the international competition for Senior Lecturer in Human Microanatomy & Histology, Human Embryology & Medical Parasitology in the Medical School of the University of the Witwatersrand, Johannesburg, Republic of South Africa. Among numerous candidates applying, he was successfully selected for this position. During his four-year tenure (1984–1988) as senior lecturer in the four subject areas, he also supervised research projects of 3 students for their M.Sc degrees. Upon returning to Europe, he resumed association with Institute of Parasitology in 1993. In 1995, University of Warsaw awarded him the D.Sc degree. In 1999 he became professor at the Institute of Parasitology in Warsaw.
