= Gmina Olecko =

Gmina Olecko Olecko Commune
- Gmina
- Coat of arms

- Location within Warmian-Masurian Voivodeship Location within Poland
- Coordinates (Olecko): 54°2′N 22°30′E
- Country: Poland
- Voivodeship: Warmian-Masurian
- County: Olecko
- Seat: Olecko

Area
  - Total: 266.6 km^{2} (102.9 sq mi)

Population (2006)
  - Total: 21,413
  - Density: 80.32/km^{2} (208.0/sq mi)
  - Urban: 16,169
  - Rural: 5,244
- Website: http://www.um.olecko.pl/

Gmina Olecko is an urban-rural gmina (administrative district) in Olecko County, Warmian-Masurian Voivodeship, in northern Poland. Its seat is the town of Olecko, which lies approximately 135 kilometres (84 mi) east of the regional capital Olsztyn.

The gmina covers an area of 266.6 square kilometres (102.9 sq mi), and as of 2006 its total population is 21,413 (out of which the population of Olecko amounts to 16,169, and the population of the rural part of the gmina is 5,244).

== Villages ==
Apart from the town of Olecko, Gmina Olecko contains the villages and settlements of Babki Gąseckie, Babki Oleckie, Biała Olecka, Borawskie, Borawskie Małe, Dąbrowskie, Dąbrowskie-Osiedle, Dobki, Doliwy, Duły, Gąski, Giże, Gordejki, Gordejki Małe, Imionki, Imionki PKP, Jaśki, Judziki, Kijewo, Kolonia Olecko, Kukowo, Łęgowo, Lenarty, Lipkowo, Możne, Olszewo, Pieńki, Plewki, Przytuły, Raczki Wielkie, Rosochackie, Sedranki, Skowronki, Ślepie, Świdry, Szczecinki, Wólka Kijewska, Zabielne, Zajdy, Zatyki and Zielonówek.

== Neighbouring gminas ==
Gmina Olecko is bordered by the gminas of Bakałarzewo, Ełk, Filipów, Kalinowo, Kowale Oleckie, Świętajno and Wieliczki.
