= Sulejki =

- Village
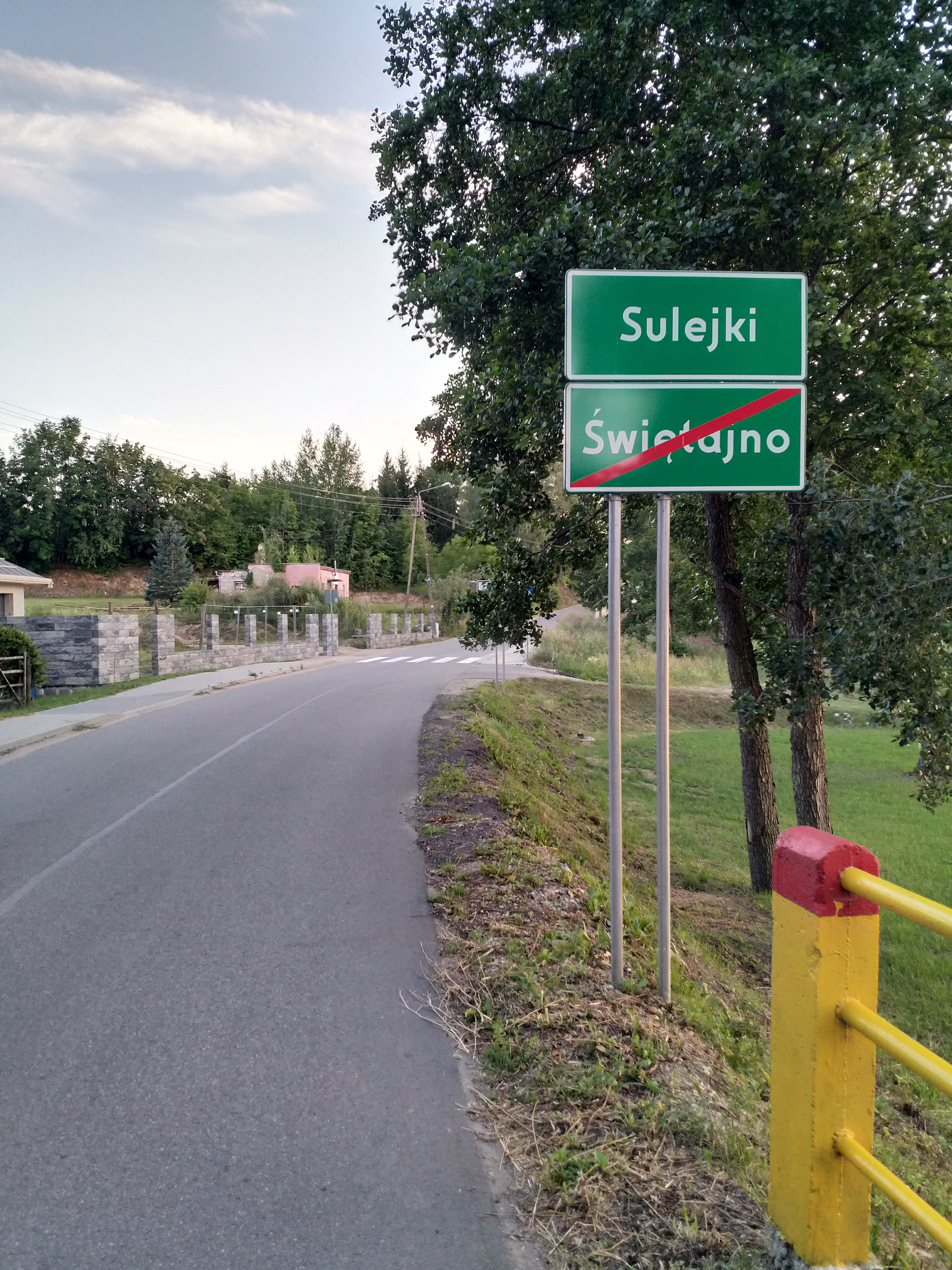

- Location within Poland
- Coordinates: 53°59′N 22°19′E
- Country: Poland
- Voivodeship: Warmian-Masurian
- County: Olecko
- Gmina: Świętajno
- Founded: 1550
- Founder: Jakub Dąbrowski
- Time zone: UTC+1 (CET)
  - Summer (DST): UTC+2 (CEST)
- Vehicle registration: NOE

Sulejki [suˈlɛi̯ki] is a village in the administrative district of Gmina Świętajno, within Olecko County, Warmian-Masurian Voivodeship, in north-eastern Poland. It is located on the northern and eastern shore of Lake Świętajno in the region of Masuria.

== History ==
The origins of the village date back to 1550, when Jakub Dąbrowski bought land to establish a village. The village historically had two equivalent Polish names, Sulejki and Dąbrowskie, the latter of which was derived from the last name of its founder. As of 1600, the population was solely Polish.

Siegfried Lenz's book of short stories "So zärtlich war Suleyken" refers to a fictitious village of the same name (as mentioned in a postscript in the same book).
