= Olecko County =

Olecko County Powiat olecki
- County
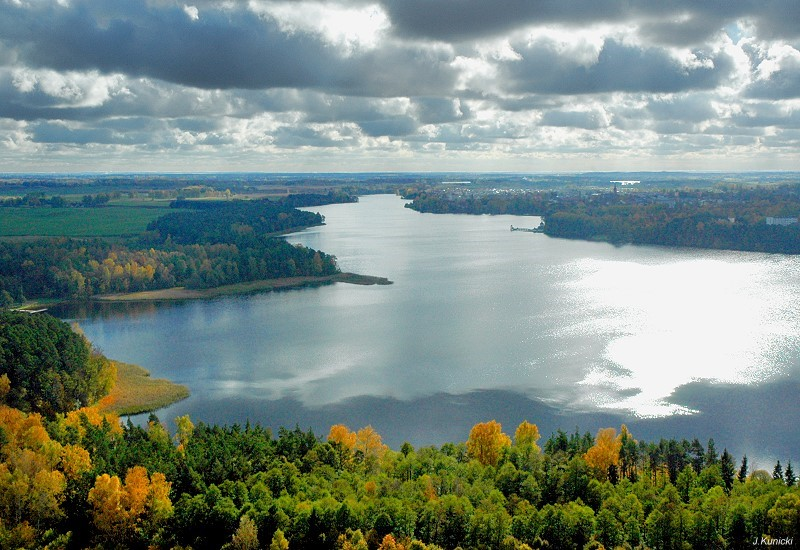
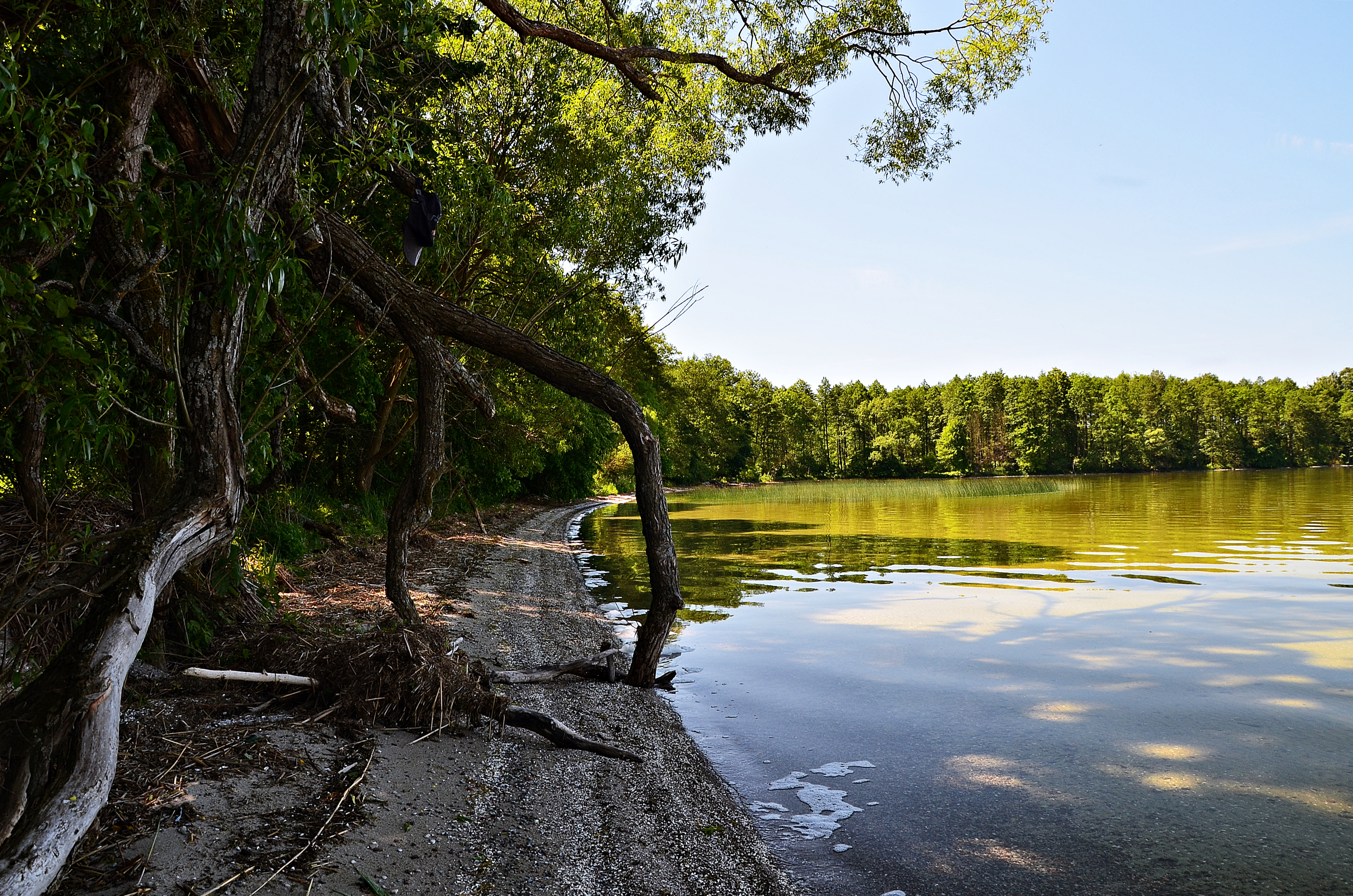
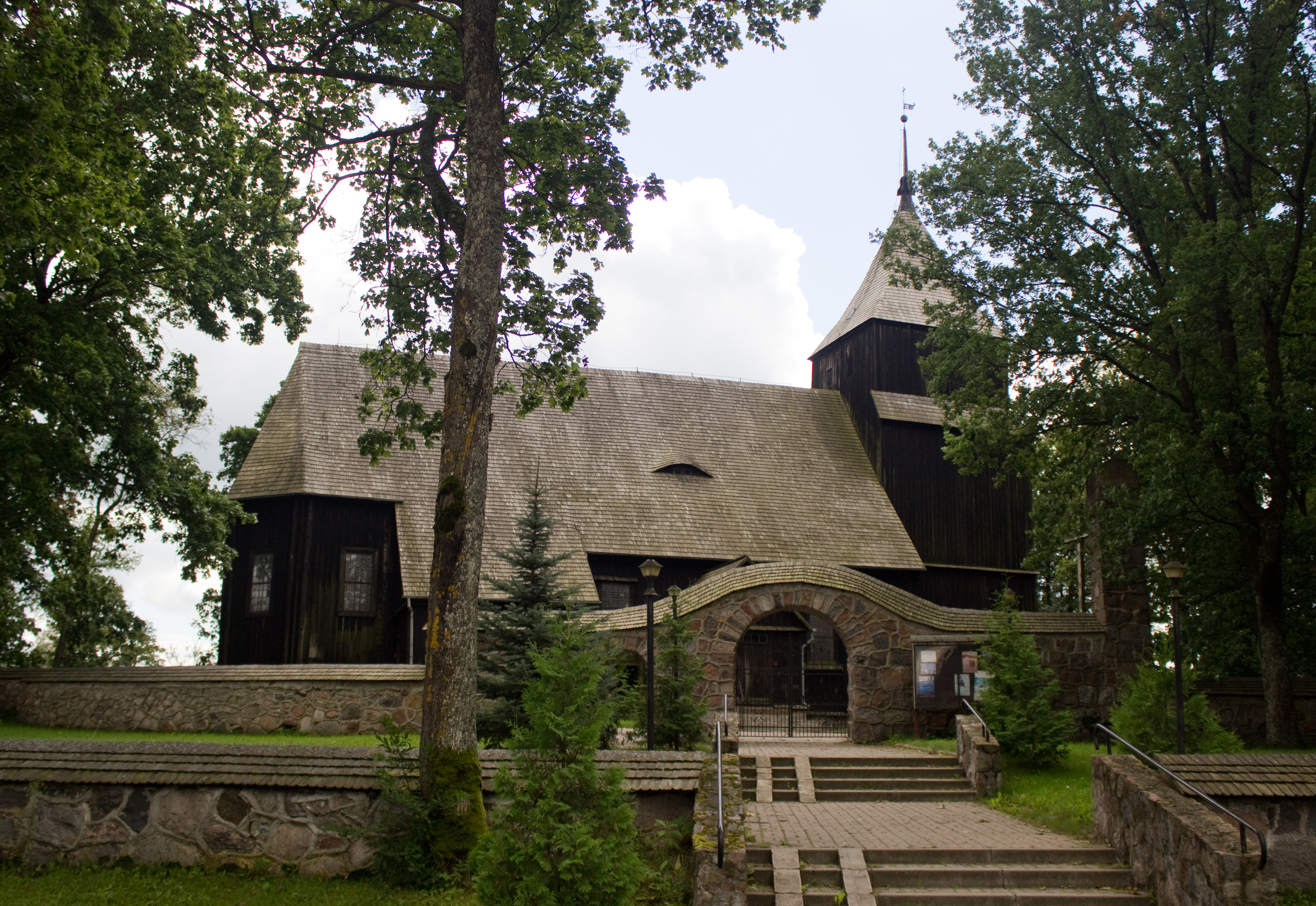
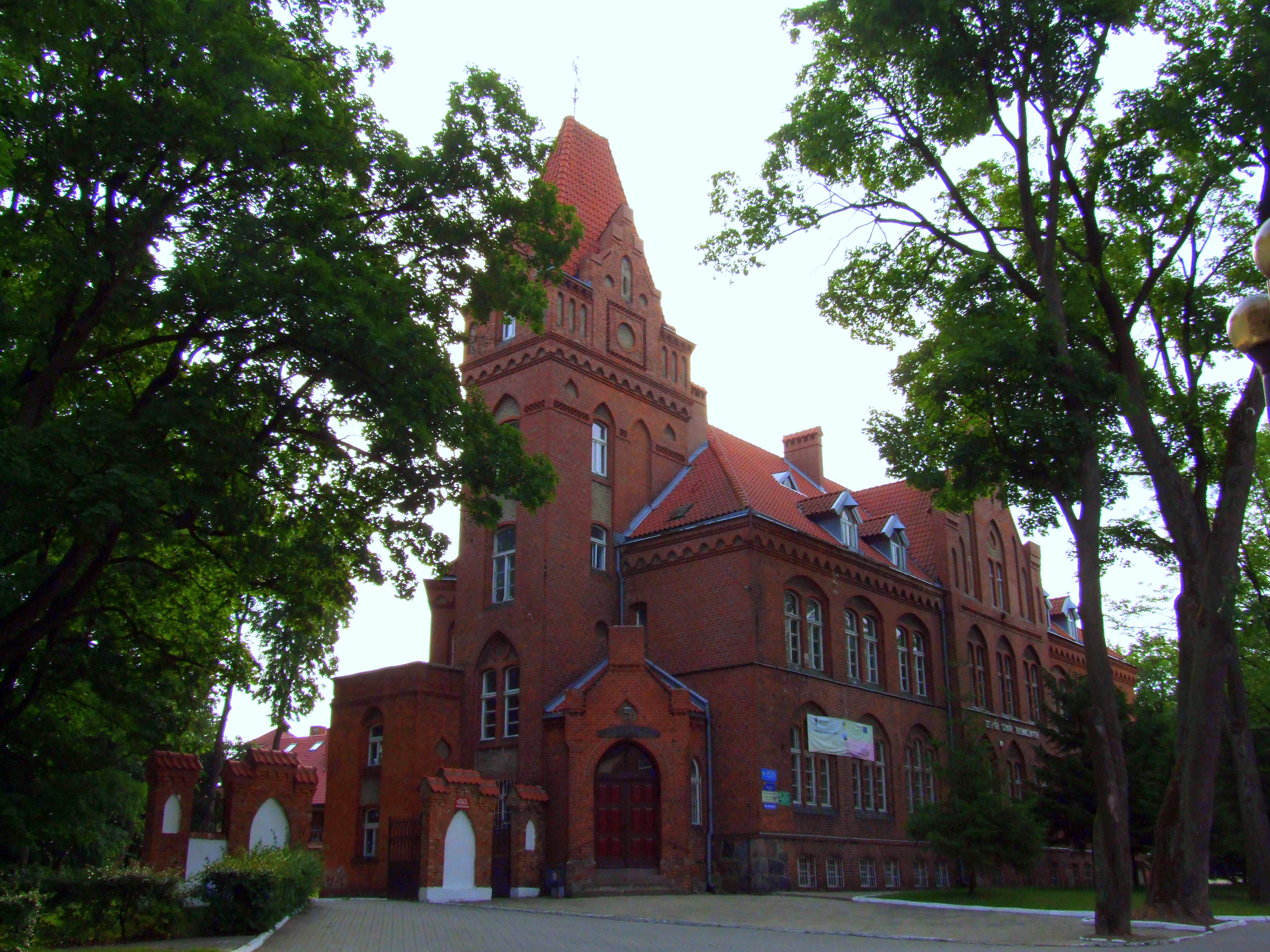
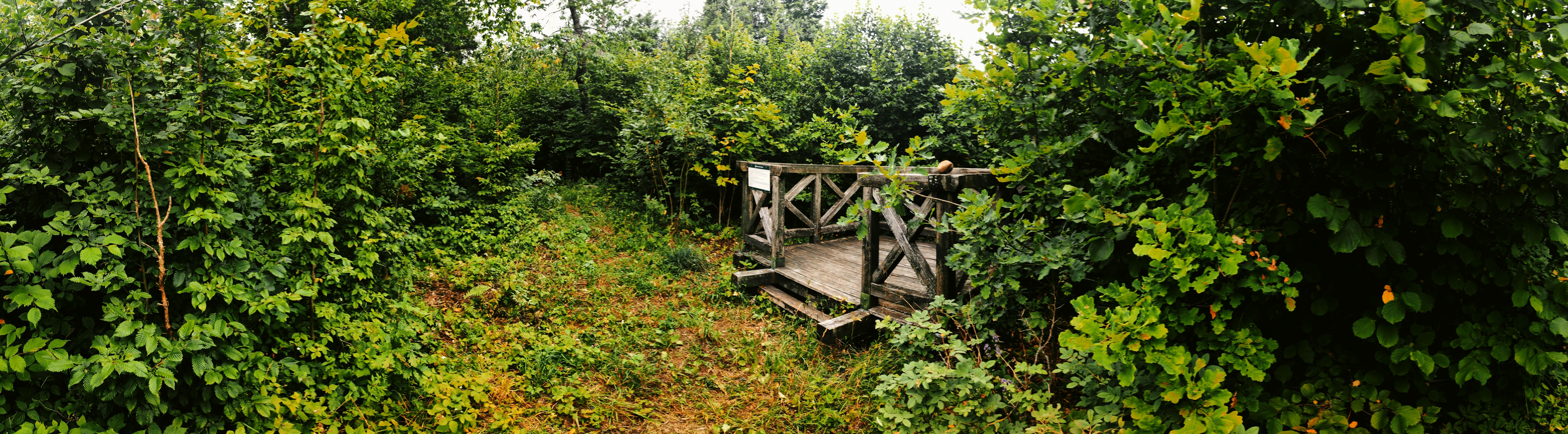
- Oleckie Wielkie Lake Dobskie Lake Church of the Nativity in Wieliczki Technical school in Olecko Szeska Hill

- Flag Coat of arms

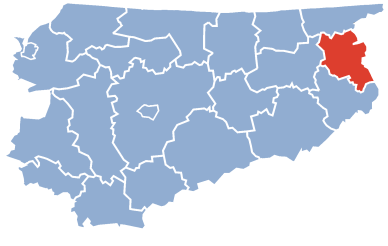
- Location within the voivodeship
- Coordinates (Olecko): 54°2′N 22°30′E
- Country: Poland
- Voivodeship: Warmian-Masurian
- Seat: Olecko
- Gminas: Total 4: Gmina Kowale Oleckie; Gmina Olecko; Gmina Świętajno; Gmina Wieliczki

Area
  - Total: 873.57 km^{2} (337.29 sq mi)

Population (2024)
  - Total: 31,863
  - Density: 36.474/km^{2} (94.468/sq mi)
  - Urban: 15,617
  - Rural: 16,246
- Time zone: UTC+1 (CET)
  - Summer (DST): UTC+2 (CEST)
- Car plates: NOE
- Website: www.powiat.olecko.pl

Olecko County (Polish: powiat olecki) is a unit of territorial administration and local government (powiat) in Warmian-Masurian Voivodeship, north-eastern Poland. Its administrative seat and only town is Olecko, which lies 135 kilometres (84 mi) east of the regional capital Olsztyn.

When powiats were re-introduced in the Polish local government reforms of 1999, the present Gołdap and Olecko Counties made up a single entity (called powiat olecko-gołdapski or Olecko-Gołdap County). This was divided into two in 2002.

The county covers an area of 873.57 square kilometres (337.3 sq mi). As of 2024 its total population is 31,863, out of which the population of Olecko is 15,617 and the rural population is 16,246.

== Neighbouring counties ==
Olecko County is bordered by Gołdap County to the north, Suwałki County to the east, Ełk County to the south and Giżycko County to the west.

== Administrative division ==
The county is subdivided into four gminas (one urban-rural and three rural). These are listed in the following table, in descending order of population.

Gmina	Type	Area (km^{2}, 2024)	Population (2024)	Seat
Gmina Olecko	urban-rural	266.73	20,871	Olecko
Gmina Kowale Oleckie	rural	251.12	4,525	Kowale Oleckie
Gmina Świętajno	rural	214.93	3,293	Świętajno
Gmina Wieliczki	rural	140.79	3,174	Wieliczki
