= Borki =

Borki may refer to:

== People ==
- Borki Predojević (born 1987), Bosnian chess Grandmaster

== Places ==
=== Poland ===
- Borki, Koło County in Greater Poland Voivodeship (central Poland)
- Borki, Konin County in Greater Poland Voivodeship (central Poland)
- Borki, Słupca County in Greater Poland Voivodeship (west-central Poland)
- Borki, Złotów County in Greater Poland Voivodeship (west-central Poland)
- Borki, Bydgoszcz County in Kuyavian-Pomeranian Voivodeship (north-central Poland)
- Borki, Rypin County in Kuyavian-Pomeranian Voivodeship (north-central Poland)
- Borki, Tuchola County in Kuyavian-Pomeranian Voivodeship (north-central Poland)
- Borki, Lesser Poland Voivodeship (south Poland)
- Borki, Bełchatów County in Łódź Voivodeship (central Poland)
- Borki, Brzeziny County in Łódź Voivodeship (central Poland)
- Borki, Łęczyca County in Łódź Voivodeship (central Poland)
- Borki, Łódź East County in Łódź Voivodeship (central Poland)
- Borki, Pajęczno County in Łódź Voivodeship (central Poland)
- Borki, Gmina Gidle in Łódź Voivodeship (central Poland)
- Borki, Gmina Ładzice in Łódź Voivodeship (central Poland)
- Borki, Gmina Masłowice in Łódź Voivodeship (central Poland)
- Borki, Lower Silesian Voivodeship (south-west Poland)
- Borki, Biłgoraj County in Lublin Voivodeship (east Poland)
- Borki, Łuków County in Lublin Voivodeship (east Poland)
- Borki, Radzyń County in Lublin Voivodeship (east Poland)
- Borki, Ryki County in Lublin Voivodeship (east Poland)
- Borki, Mińsk County in Masovian Voivodeship (east-central Poland)
- Borki, Ostrołęka County in Masovian Voivodeship (east-central Poland)
- Borki, Gmina Sobienie-Jeziory in Masovian Voivodeship (east-central Poland)
- Borki, Piaseczno County in Masovian Voivodeship (east-central Poland)
- Borki, Płock County in Masovian Voivodeship (central Poland)
- Borki, Siedlce County in Masovian Voivodeship (east-central Poland)
- Borki, Sokołów County in Masovian Voivodeship (east-central Poland)
- Borki, Szydłowiec County in Masovian Voivodeship (east-central Poland)
- Borki, Gmina Jadów in Masovian Voivodeship (east-central Poland)
- Borki, Gmina Radzymin in Masovian Voivodeship (east-central Poland)
- Borki, Zwoleń County in Masovian Voivodeship (east-central Poland)
- Borki, Żuromin County in Masovian Voivodeship (north-central Poland)
- Borki, Opole Voivodeship (south Poland)
- Borki, Białystok County in Podlaskie Voivodeship (north-east Poland)
- Borki, Hajnówka County in Podlaskie Voivodeship (east Poland)
- Borki, Subcarpathian Voivodeship (south-east Poland)
- Borki, Jędrzejów County in Świętokrzyskie Voivodeship (south-central Poland)
- Borki, Kielce County in Świętokrzyskie Voivodeship (south-central Poland)
- Borki, Staszów County in Świętokrzyskie Voivodeship (south-central Poland)
- Borki, Bartoszyce County in Warmian-Masurian Voivodeship (north Poland)
- Borki, Działdowo County in Warmian-Masurian Voivodeship (north Poland)
- Borki, Gmina Ełk in Warmian-Masurian Voivodeship (north-east Poland)
- Borki, Gmina Prostki in Warmian-Masurian Voivodeship (north-east Poland)
- Borki, Gmina Kruklanki in Warmian-Masurian Voivodeship (north-east Poland)
- Borki, Gmina Miłki in Warmian-Masurian Voivodeship (north-east Poland)
- Borki, Nowe Miasto County in Warmian-Masurian Voivodeship (north Poland)
- Borki, Olecko County in Warmian-Masurian Voivodeship (north-east Poland)
- Borki, Pisz County in Warmian-Masurian Voivodeship (north-east Poland)
- Borki, West Pomeranian Voivodeship (north-west Poland)

=== Russia ===
- Borki, Russia, name of several rural localities in Russia

=== Ukraine ===
- See Birky (disambiguation)
