= Borki, Russia =

Borki (Russian: Борки) is the name of several rural localities in Russia.

== Arkhangelsk Oblast ==
As of 2010, one rural locality in Arkhangelsk Oblast bears this name:

- Borki, Arkhangelsk Oblast, a village in Koryazhemsky Selsoviet of Kotlassky District

== Belgorod Oblast ==
As of 2010, one rural locality in Belgorod Oblast bears this name:

- Borki, Belgorod Oblast, a selo in Borchansky Rural Okrug of Valuysky District

== Bryansk Oblast ==
As of 2010, one rural locality in Bryansk Oblast bears this name:

- Borki, Bryansk Oblast, a settlement in Smolevichsky Selsoviet of Klintsovsky District

== Republic of Buryatia ==
As of 2010, one rural locality in the Republic of Buryatia bears this name:

- Borki, Republic of Buryatia, a settlement in Tvorogovsky Selsoviet of Kabansky District

== Chuvash Republic ==
As of 2010, one rural locality in the Chuvash Republic bears this name:

- Borki, Chuvash Republic, a settlement in Altyshevskoye Rural Settlement of Alatyrsky District

== Kirov Oblast ==
As of 2010, three rural localities in Kirov Oblast bear this name:

- Borki, Pokrovsky Rural Okrug, Kotelnichsky District, Kirov Oblast, a village in Pokrovsky Rural Okrug of Kotelnichsky District
- Borki, Yuryevsky Rural Okrug, Kotelnichsky District, Kirov Oblast, a village in Yuryevsky Rural Okrug of Kotelnichsky District
- Borki, Orichevsky District, Kirov Oblast, a village in Spas-Talitsky Rural Okrug of Orichevsky District

== Krasnoyarsk Krai ==
As of 2010, three rural localities in Krasnoyarsk Krai bear this name:

- Borki, Abansky District, Krasnoyarsk Krai, a village in Petropavlovsky Selsoviet of Abansky District
- Borki, Dzerzhinsky District, Krasnoyarsk Krai, a village in Denisovsky Selsoviet of Dzerzhinsky District
- Borki, Yeniseysky District, Krasnoyarsk Krai, a village in Ozernovsky Selsoviet of Yeniseysky District

== Kurgan Oblast ==
As of 2010, two rural localities in Kurgan Oblast bear this name:

- Borki, Ketovsky District, Kurgan Oblast, a village in Paderinsky Selsoviet of Ketovsky District
- Borki, Shchuchansky District, Kurgan Oblast, a village in Nifansky Selsoviet of Shchuchansky District

== Kursk Oblast ==
As of 2010, two rural localities in Kursk Oblast bear this name:

- Borki, Dmitriyevsky District, Kursk Oblast, a settlement in Novopershinsky Selsoviet of Dmitriyevsky District
- Borki, Sudzhansky District, Kursk Oblast, a selo in Borkovsky Selsoviet of Sudzhansky District

== Leningrad Oblast ==
As of 2010, three rural localities in Leningrad Oblast bear this name:

- Borki, Boksitogorsky District, Leningrad Oblast, a village in Bolshedvorskoye Settlement Municipal Formation of Boksitogorsky District
- Borki, Slantsevsky District, Leningrad Oblast, a village in Vyskatskoye Settlement Municipal Formation of Slantsevsky District
- Borki, Vyborgsky District, Leningrad Oblast, a logging depot settlement in Krasnoselskoye Settlement Municipal Formation of Vyborgsky District

== Lipetsk Oblast ==
As of 2010, two rural localities in Lipetsk Oblast bear this name:

- Borki, Terbunsky District, Lipetsk Oblast, a selo in Borkovsky Selsoviet of Terbunsky District
- Borki, Zadonsky District, Lipetsk Oblast, a village in Kamensky Selsoviet of Zadonsky District

== Moscow Oblast ==
As of 2010, four rural localities in Moscow Oblast bear this name:

- Borki, Istrinsky District, Moscow Oblast, a village in Ivanovskoye Rural Settlement of Istrinsky District
- Borki, Klinsky District, Moscow Oblast, a village in Voroninskoye Rural Settlement of Klinsky District
- Borki, Lotoshinsky District, Moscow Oblast, a village in Osheykinskoye Rural Settlement of Lotoshinsky District
- Borki, Odintsovsky District, Moscow Oblast, a village in Uspenskoye Rural Settlement of Odintsovsky District

== Nizhny Novgorod Oblast ==
As of 2010, one rural locality in Nizhny Novgorod Oblast bears this name:

- Borki, Nizhny Novgorod Oblast, a selo in Butakovsky Selsoviet of Voznesensky District

== Novgorod Oblast ==
As of 2010, six rural localities in Novgorod Oblast bear this name:

- Borki, Batetsky District, Novgorod Oblast, a village in Peredolskoye Settlement of Batetsky District
- Borki, Lyubytinsky District, Novgorod Oblast, a village under the administrative jurisdiction of the urban-type settlement of Lyubytino in Lyubytinsky District
- Borki, Novgorodsky District, Novgorod Oblast, a village in Borkovskoye Settlement of Novgorodsky District
- Borki, Parfinsky District, Novgorod Oblast, a village in Polavskoye Settlement of Parfinsky District
- Borki, Pestovsky District, Novgorod Oblast, a village in Ustyutskoye Settlement of Pestovsky District
- Borki, Soletsky District, Novgorod Oblast, a village in Dubrovskoye Settlement of Soletsky District

== Omsk Oblast ==
As of 2010, two rural localities in Omsk Oblast bear this name:

- Borki, Kormilovsky District, Omsk Oblast, a selo in Borchansky Rural Okrug of Kormilovsky District
- Borki, Ust-Ishimsky District, Omsk Oblast, a settlement in Panovsky Rural Okrug of Ust-Ishimsky District

== Oryol Oblast ==
As of 2010, one rural locality in Oryol Oblast bears this name:

- Borki, Oryol Oblast, a settlement in Russko-Brodsky Selsoviet of Verkhovsky District

== Pskov Oblast ==
As of 2010, ten rural localities in Pskov Oblast bear this name:

- Borki, Nevelsky District, Pskov Oblast, a village in Nevelsky District
- Borki, Novorzhevsky District, Pskov Oblast, a village in Novorzhevsky District
- Borki, Ostrovsky District, Pskov Oblast, a village in Ostrovsky District
- Borki, Porkhovsky District, Pskov Oblast, a village in Porkhovsky District
- Borki, Pskovsky District, Pskov Oblast, a village in Pskovsky District
- Borki, Pustoshkinsky District, Pskov Oblast, a village in Pustoshkinsky District
- Borki (Mostishchenskaya Rural Settlement), Sebezhsky District, Pskov Oblast, a village in Sebezhsky District; municipally, a part of Mostishchenskaya Rural Settlement of that district
- Borki (Boyarinovskaya Rural Settlement), Sebezhsky District, Pskov Oblast, a village in Sebezhsky District; municipally, a part of Boyarinovskaya Rural Settlement of that district
- Borki, Strugo-Krasnensky District, Pskov Oblast, a village in Strugo-Krasnensky District
- Borki, Velikoluksky District, Pskov Oblast, a village in Velikoluksky District

== Ryazan Oblast ==
As of 2010, two rural localities in Ryazan Oblast bear this name:

- Borki, Shatsky District, Ryazan Oblast, a selo in Borkovskoy Rural Okrug of Shatsky District
- Borki, Shilovsky District, Ryazan Oblast, a selo in Borkovsky Rural Okrug of Shilovsky District

== Saratov Oblast ==
As of 2010, one rural locality in Saratov Oblast bears this name:

- Borki, Saratov Oblast, a selo in Rtishchevsky District

== Smolensk Oblast ==
As of 2010, four rural localities in Smolensk Oblast bear this name:

- Borki, Demidovsky District, Smolensk Oblast, a village in Borkovskoye Rural Settlement of Demidovsky District
- Borki, Dukhovshchinsky District, Smolensk Oblast, a village in Prechistenskoye Rural Settlement of Dukhovshchinsky District
- Borki, Krasninsky District, Smolensk Oblast, a village in Glubokinskoye Rural Settlement of Krasninsky District
- Borki, Rudnyansky District, Smolensk Oblast, a village in Ponizovskoye Rural Settlement of Rudnyansky District

== Tver Oblast ==
As of 2010, seventeen rural localities in Tver Oblast bear this name:

- Borki, Belsky District, Tver Oblast, a village in Yegoryevskoye Rural Settlement of Belsky District
- Borki, Borkovskoye Rural Settlement, Bezhetsky District, Tver Oblast, a village in Borkovskoye Rural Settlement of Bezhetsky District
- Borki, Zobinskoye Rural Settlement, Bezhetsky District, Tver Oblast, a village in Zobinskoye Rural Settlement of Bezhetsky District
- Borki, Firovsky District, Tver Oblast, a village in Firovskoye Rural Settlement of Firovsky District
- Borki, Kashinsky District, Tver Oblast, a village in Slavkovskoye Rural Settlement of Kashinsky District
- Borki, Lesnoy District, Tver Oblast, a village in Bokhtovskoye Rural Settlement of Lesnoy District
- Borki, Likhoslavlsky District, Tver Oblast, a village in Tolmachevskoye Rural Settlement of Likhoslavlsky District
- Borki, Nelidovsky District, Tver Oblast, a village in Novoselkovskoye Rural Settlement of Nelidovsky District
- Borki, Oleninsky District, Tver Oblast, a village in Grishinskoye Rural Settlement of Oleninsky District
- Borki, Chaykinskoye Rural Settlement, Penovsky District, Tver Oblast, a village in Chaykinskoye Rural Settlement of Penovsky District
- Borki, Okhvatskoye Rural Settlement, Penovsky District, Tver Oblast, a village in Okhvatskoye Rural Settlement of Penovsky District
- Borki, Rameshkovsky District, Tver Oblast, a village in Aleshino Rural Settlement of Rameshkovsky District
- Borki, Staritsky District, Tver Oblast, a village in Lukovnikovo Rural Settlement of Staritsky District
- Borki, Vesyegonsky District, Tver Oblast, a village in Lyubegoshchinskoye Rural Settlement of Vesyegonsky District
- Borki, Vyshnevolotsky District, Tver Oblast, a village in Luzhnikovskoye Rural Settlement of Vyshnevolotsky District
- Borki, Zubtsovskoye Rural Settlement, Zubtsovsky District, Tver Oblast, a village in Zubtsovskoye Rural Settlement of Zubtsovsky District
- Borki, Zubtsovskoye Rural Settlement, Zubtsovsky District, Tver Oblast, a village in Zubtsovskoye Rural Settlement of Zubtsovsky District

== Tyumen Oblast ==
As of 2010, two rural localities in Tyumen Oblast bear this name:

- Borki, Tyumensky District, Tyumen Oblast, a selo in Borkovsky Rural Okrug of Tyumensky District
- Borki, Vikulovsky District, Tyumen Oblast, a village in Kalininsky Rural Okrug of Vikulovsky District

== Voronezh Oblast ==
As of 2010, one rural locality in Voronezh Oblast bears this name:

- Borki, Voronezh Oblast, a village in Berezovskoye Rural Settlement of Ramonsky District
