= Borki train disaster =

1888 event involving Alexander III of Russia

Coordinates: 49°41′15.30″N 36°07′41.50″E

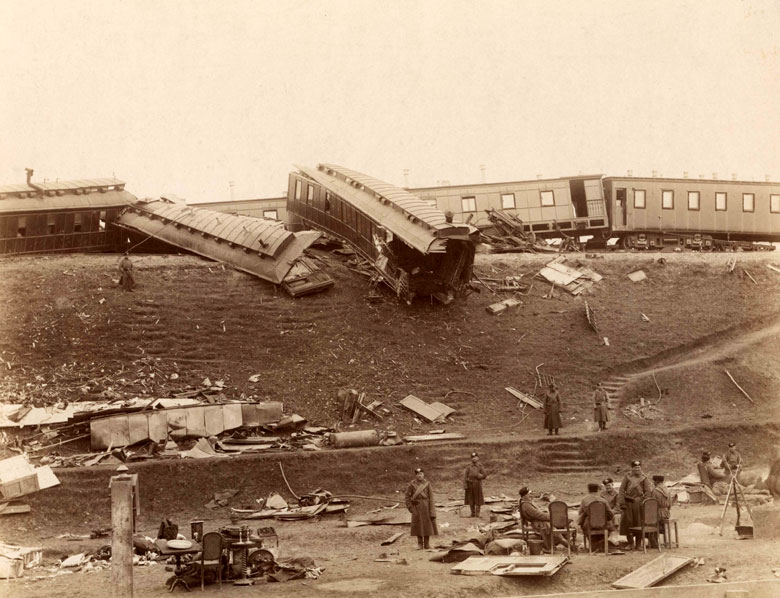
- Photograph of the crash site soon after the disaster

Details
- Date: 29 October [O.S. 17 October] 1888
- Location: Near Borki station, Kharkov Governorate
- Country: Russian Empire
- Line: Kursk–Kharkov mainline
- Operator: Kursk–Kharkov–Azov Railroad
- Incident type: Derailment
- Cause: Inconclusive: combination of speeding, overload and faulty track

Statistics
- Trains: 1
- Deaths: 23 (21 on the site, 2 in hospital)
- Injured: 14 to 37

The Borki train disaster occurred on 29 October [O.S. 17 October] 1888 near Borki station in Kharkov Governorate of the Russian Empire (present-day Birky, Ukraine), 295 kilometres (183 mi) south of Kursk, when the imperial train carrying Emperor Alexander III of Russia and his family from Crimea to Saint Petersburg derailed at high speed. Twenty-one people died at the scene and two later, and many others were injured. According to the official version of events, Alexander held the collapsed roof of the royal car on his shoulders while his family escaped the crash site uninjured. The story of the miraculous escape became part of contemporary lore and government propaganda. The investigation into the crash, led by Anatoly Koni, resulted in the appointment of railway manager and the future Russian prime minister, Sergei Witte, as the director of State Railways.

== The accident ==
The imperial family was en route from Crimea to Saint Petersburg. Contrary to railway rules of the period that limited commercial passenger trains to 42 axles, the imperial train of fifteen carriages had 64 axles. Its weight was within the limits set for freight trains, but the train actually travelled at express speeds. It was hauled by two steam engines, a combination that caused dangerous vibrations that, according to Witte, directly caused the derailment. Technical flaws of the imperial train were known in advance, yet it had operated for nearly a decade without incidents.

According to a soldier of the 121st Penza Cossack Infantry Regiment, who was guarding the railway line at the time of the crash, there was a terrible noise, after which the forward section of the imperial train suddenly stopped. Immediately thereafter, the rear cars started colliding with each other, being reduced to rubble. As a result of the collision, the train machinists were ejected onto the railway embankment, losing consciousness. According to descriptions by witnesses, the site of the disaster presented a field of debris, mixed with severed human body parts.

Twenty-one people were killed instantly. According to official reports, corroborated by Witte's memoirs, at the moment of the crash the imperial family was in the dining car. Its roof collapsed in the crash, and Alexander reportedly held the remains of the roof on his shoulders as the children fled outdoors. In reality it is unlikely that a human could have held the train's roof alone, and the impression probably stems from the fact, that the emperor had been initially trapped by the debris and managed to escape among the last survivors.

Among those killed in the catastrophe was the emperor's waiter. Transport minister Konstantin Posyet and painter Mihály Zichy, who were travelling in one car with the imperial family, survived without serious injury. In total, 37 people were wounded as a result of the crash. None of the royal family initially appeared to be hurt, but the onset of Alexander's kidney failure was later linked to the blunt trauma suffered in Borki.

== Publicity ==
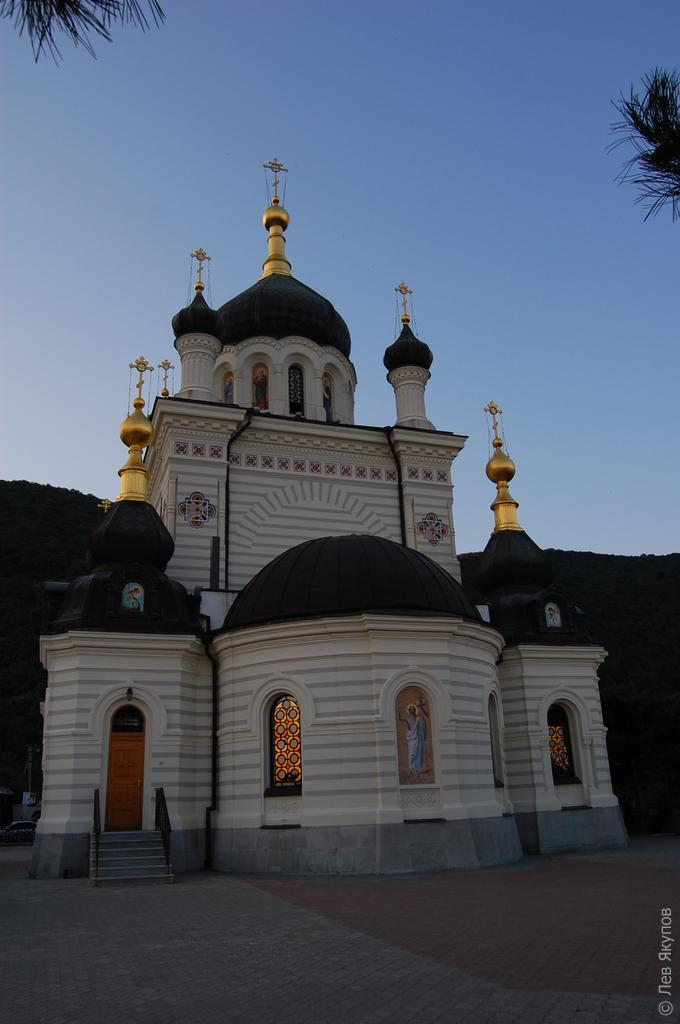
The Foros Church is one of many churches built to glorify God for the emperor's survival.

Following the crash, transport minister Posyet declared the accident to have resulted from sabotage. An anonymous letter, which started circulating soon thereafter, blamed baron Sherval, chief engineer of the railway, of organizing an assassination attempt on the emperor, disguised as an accident. Rumours appeared among the public, that the crash had been provoked by the explosion of a bomb, which had been supposedly carried into the train hidden inside of an ice cream mold by a cook's apprentice. Those rumours were contributed to by the fact of previous assassination attempts against the emperor's predecessor Alexander II. The survival of the Romanovs was celebrated. According to Witte, when Alexander returned to Saint Petersburg and went to the Kazan Cathedral, university students wanted to unharness his carriage and pull it by hand.

In the view of the established religion, the salvation of the imperial family was hailed as divine intervention by the Sovereign. Pamphlets by clergymen linked the miraculous escape to the miracles of 17th-century icons at the end of the great plague of 1654–1655; the laity believed that prayers in front of these icons enabled the survival of the emperor. A special icon of the God's Grace on the 17th of October, made for the occasion, widely circulated in photographic copies. Moscow, the old shrine of Orthodoxy, was perceived as the source of the miracle; a contemporary pamphlet declared that the "power that Moscow had professed and that had exalted her revoked these laws [of Nature]".

== Investigation ==
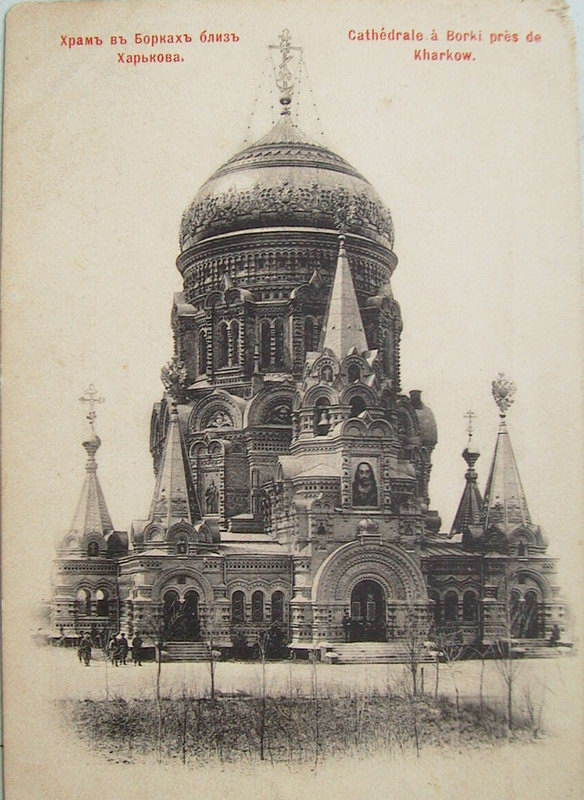
The Borki Cathedral was built to commemorate the event. Its less ornate replicas include Church of the Epiphany (Saint Petersburg) and the Harbin Orthodox Cathedral.

Immediately after the crash, the Chief Inspector of Railways, Baron Sherval, who had been travelling on the royal train and had broken his leg in the crash, summoned railway manager Witte and director of the Kharkov Technical Institute, Victor Kirpichev, to lead the investigation on site. Anatoly Koni, an influential public lawyer, was dispatched from Saint Petersburg later.

In the preceding years, Witte had been regularly involved in managing imperial train journeys across his railroad and was well known to the emperor. Two months before the crash, Alexander, upset about Witte's insistence on reducing train speed limits, had publicly chastised him and his railway, referring to its owners' ethnicity: "Nowhere else has my speed been reduced; your railroad is an impossible one because it is a Jewish road". According to Witte, he had warned the government earlier of the deficiencies in train setup, notably using paired steam engines and faulty saloon cars.

A dent discovered by an engineer investigating the crash site on one of the rails, was claimed to correspond with a similar trace left on one of the train's brake shafts. The train's speed records showed, that it had been travelling almost twice faster than permitted. Additionally, the railway ties at the site of the disaster showed traces of disintegration, and the railway embankment had been constructed from slag instead of gravel.

It was suspected, that the management of Kursk-Kharkiv-Azov Railway had neglected the upkeep of its infrastructure in order to reduce spending, as to increase total profits; the company was set for purchase by state authorities in December 1888, two months after the disaster, with the government pledging to pay its shareholders an annual equivalent of the its highest five-year profits for the next 60 years. In order to maximize its profits, between 1880 and 1886 the board had cut the company's expenses by around 1 million rubles. To evade publicity, the management also organized emission of additional shares for central and local officials, in exchange for which the latter ignored inconsistencies in the company's annual reports. Among holders of such fictive shares was Grigory Danilevsky, editor of The Government Herald and a famous novelist.

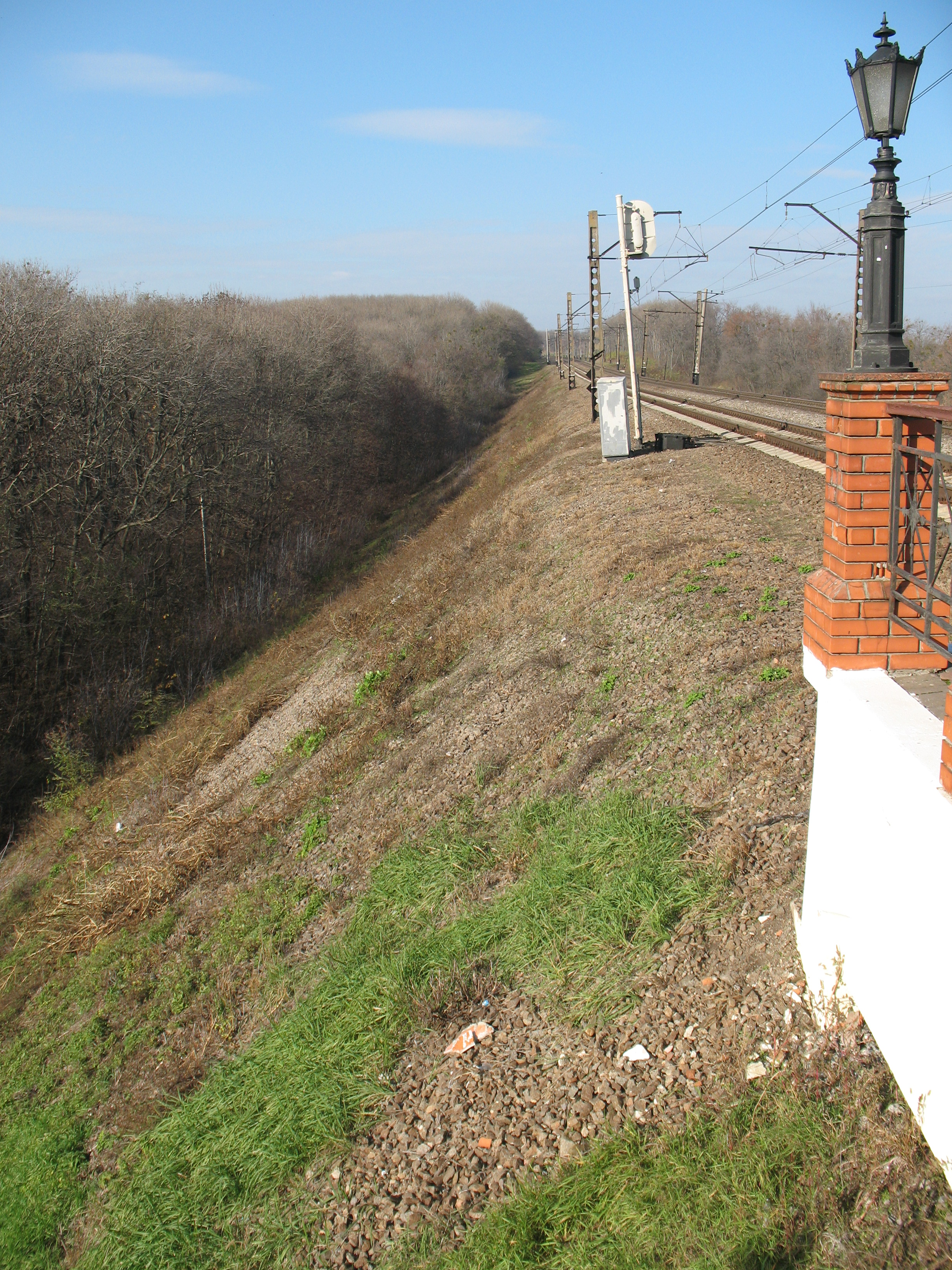
Site of the accident in modern times

The three investigators disagreed on the direct cause of the crash. Witte insisted that it was caused by speeding, exonerating railroad management; Kirpichev blamed rotten wooden ties, whilst Koni shifted the blame onto the railroad, exonerating state officials. Witte, in particular, maneuvered between blaming state officials and exonerating Minister of Communications Konstantin Posyet.

In late November 1888, Koni presented the emperor with a report, which listed the main causes of the disaster. The main factor in the crash was deemed to be overspeeding by the train crew, which had failed to slow down on an inclined section. Instead, the crew had been ordered by the train's inspector and head of security to increase speed in order not to deviate from schedule. Additionally, the two cars transporting the emperor and his heir had had their brakes removed, despite being the heaviest of all components of the train, which increased the damage. Minister Posyet was blamed by Koni of negligence, as he had failed to observe irregularities in the railway's activities. On 5 May 1889 he was officially reprimanded according to a decision of the State Council confirmed by the emperor.

In the end, Alexander preferred to close the case quietly, allowed Sherval and Posyet to retire, and appointed Witte as the director of Imperial Railways. Despite Witte's efforts, railroad management did not escape public attention. The contractor who built the Kursk-Kharkov line, Samuel Polyakov, who died two months before the crash, was posthumously linked to inferior construction quality of the railroad. The public particularly "credited" him with substandard gravel ballast pads that failed to cushion track vibrations as they were supposed to.

== See also ==
- List of Russian rail accidents

== Sources ==
- Harcave, Sidney (2004). Count Sergei Witte and the twilight of imperial Russia: a biography. M.E. Sharpe. ISBN 978-0-7656-1422-3.
- Thomas C. Owen (2005). Dilemmas of Russian capitalism: Fedor Chizhov and corporate enterprise in the railroad age. Harvard University Press. ISBN 978-0-674-01549-4.
- Witte, Sergei (1990). The memoirs of Count Witte. M.E. Sharpe. ISBN 978-0-87332-571-4.
- Wortman, Richard (2006). Scenarios of power: myth and ceremony in Russian monarchy from Peter the Great to the abdication of Nicholas II. Princeton University Press. ISBN 978-0-691-12374-5.
