= Russia has only two allies: the Army and the Navy =

Expression attributed to Tsar Alexander III

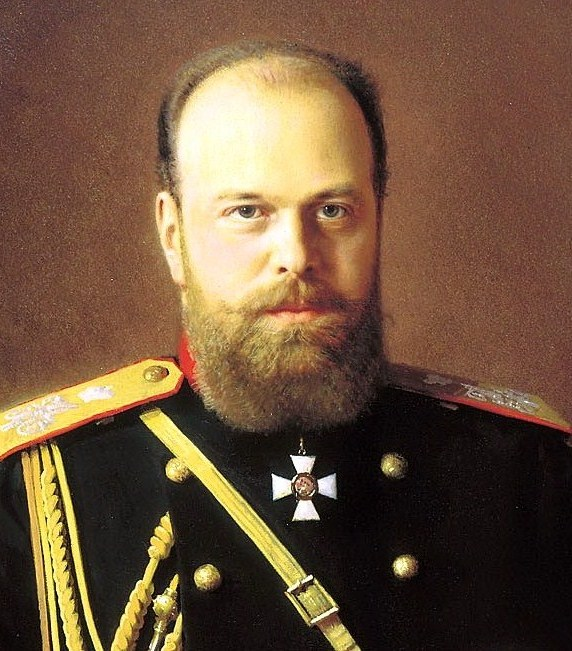
Alexander III by Ivan Kramskoi, 1886

"Russia has only two allies: the Army and the Navy" is a winged words expression, presumably attributed to Russian Emperor Alexander III. The authorship of the statement is ascribed to the ruler of the Russian Empire in the memoirs of his son-in-law, Grand Duke Alexander Mikhailovich, while other evidence that the emperor actually uttered these words is absent. In modern Russia, the phrase, still associated with Alexander III's name, has gained popularity in the Russian political milieu; words about Russia's two allies have been repeatedly used by Russian politicians in various variations.

== Background ==
Grand Duke Alexander Mikhailovich, who was the emperor's son-in-law, wrote in his memoirs about Alexander III's use of the aphorism: "In the whole world, we have only two faithful allies", he liked to tell his ministers, "our army and navy. All the rest, at the first opportunity, will turn against us themselves".

According to the grand duke, the ruler expressed this opinion in a very frank form at a reception in honor of the arrival in Russia of Prince Nicholas of Montenegro (from 1910 to 1921—King of Montenegro) in the presence of the entire diplomatic corps. Alexander III proposed a toast: "I drink to the health of my friend, Prince Nicholas of Montenegro, the only sincere and faithful ally of Russia outside its territory". After these words, Foreign Minister Nikolay Girs, according to Alexander Mikhailovich, "opened his mouth in astonishment," and the diplomats turned pale. Historian Nataliya Strunina-Borodina notes that this banquet took place on May 18, 1889. In his memoirs, the emperor's son-in-law also writes that the next day after the mentioned events, the British newspaper The Times wrote "about the astonishing speech delivered by the Russian emperor, which went against all traditions in relations between friendly powers".

Candidate of Historical Sciences Konstantin Dushenko, analyzing the history of the origin of the statement about Russia's two allies, calls the emperor's son-in-law a highly unreliable witness. In the historian's opinion, if Alexander III had indeed often repeated to his ministers the words about "two faithful allies," it is likely that not only Grand Duke Alexander Mikhailovich would have mentioned them. "However, his testimony remained the only one", Dushenko summarizes.

== Origins of the statement ==
Researcher Alexander Myasnikov notes the existence in historiography of the view that the formula "Russia has only two allies: the Army and the Navy. All the rest will betray it at the first opportunity" was formulated by the future Emperor Alexander III, at that time the heir to the throne, as a result of the events of the Congress of Berlin in 1878. Russia was forced to agree to the congress organized by Austria-Hungar and Great Britain to revise the terms of the Treaty of San Stefano of 1878, finding itself under the threat of war with these states and receiving no support from Germany. The Berlin Treaty, adopted at the end of the congress, according to historian Vladimir Georgiev, altered the terms of the Treaty of San Stefano to the detriment of the Russian Empire and the Slavic peoples of the Balkan Peninsula. "The events of the Congress of Berlin, where Russia found itself in complete isolation, and the six great powers and the Ottoman Empire pounced on it like predators on prey, were taken to heart by Alexander Alexandrovich", Myasnikov emphasizes. Nevertheless, as Konstantin Dushenko notes, contrary to popular belief, "the idea of 'splendid isolation' and reliance solely on one's own military power was completely alien to Alexander III", as evidenced most convincingly by the conclusion of a defensive alliance with France.

In Dushenko's opinion, who questions the attribution of the authorship of the statement about Russia's two allies to Alexander III, the source of this saying should be sought in Germany. Thus, the historian points out that in 1914, Russian newspapers quoted the words of German Emperor Wilhelm II: "The main support of the state is the army and navy". The Kaiser, in Dushenko's view, was following the course of the Prussian king Frederick II, who, according to legend, declared after the victory at the Battle of Hohenfriedberg: "Our best allies are our own troops".

== Influence ==
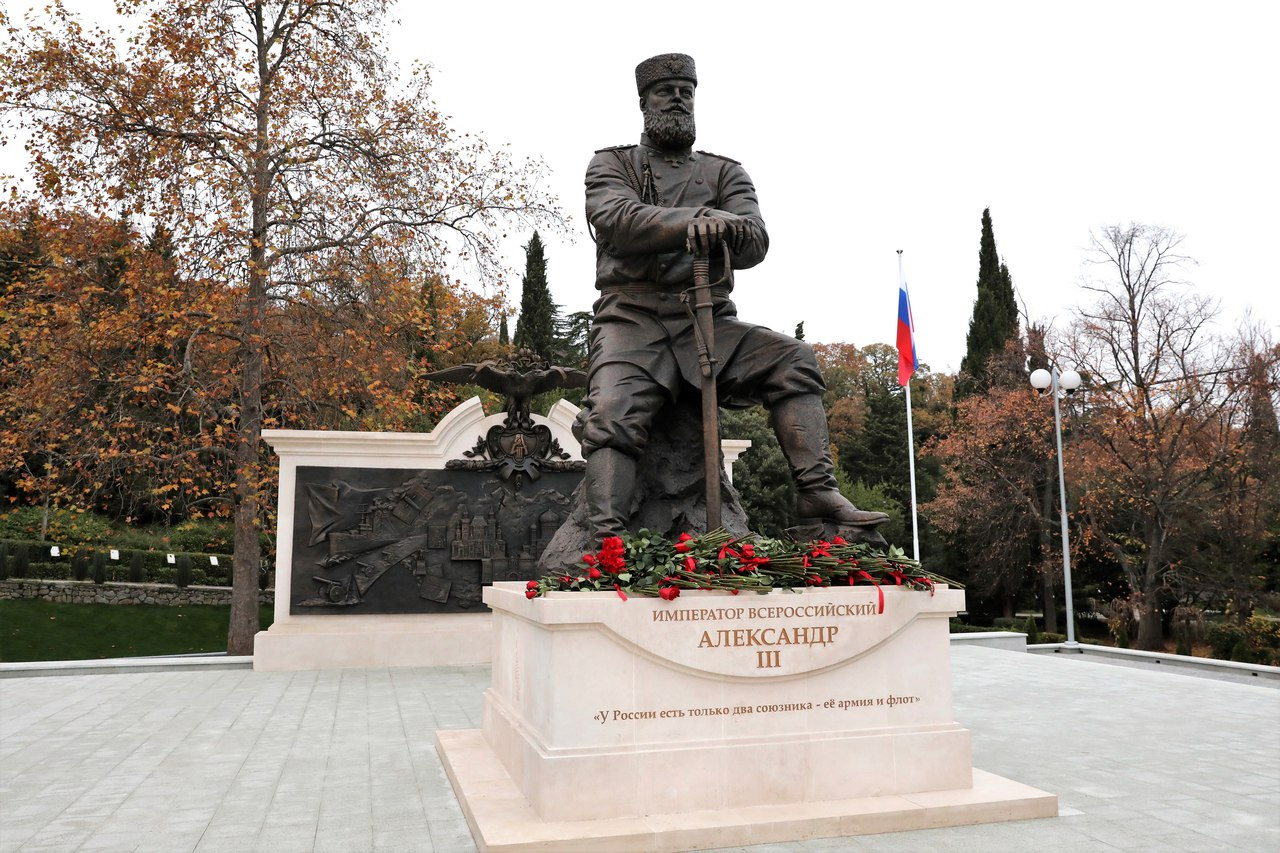
The monument to Alexander III in Yalta

The words "Russia has only two allies: the Army and the Navy" are carved on the pedestal of the monument to Alexander III in Yalta, solemnly unveiled on November 18, 2017, with the participation of Russian President Vladimir Putin.

Since the 2000s, as Konstantin Dushenko notes, the statement about Russia's two allies has become extraordinarily popular among Russia's political elite, with the researcher noting that "sometimes a third ally is added to the two". Over the years, these words in various variations have been used in speeches by Vladimir Putin ("...Alexander III once said: our vastness frightens everyone. And therefore we have only two allies—army and navy"), Vladimir Zhirinovsky ("We had Tsar Alexander III, he said that Russia has only two allies: the Army and the Navy"), Gennady Zyuganov ("The army is the second church, the second temple for our Power, and today Russia has three allies—army, navy, and Belarus"), Dmitry Rogozin ("Russia has three allies—army, Navy, and defense industry") and other Russian politicians. In a slightly altered form, the quote entered the song "Uncle Vova, We're with You" by Vyacheslav and Nikolai Antonov, which first sounded in 2017: "Our faithful friends are the Navy and the Army".

Journalist Mikhail Zygar, reflecting at the end of 2008 on the war in Georgia and the global financial crisis, noted that the phrase about Russia's two allies "has become surprisingly fashionable", coupled with confidence that the financial crisis would not affect Russia, only devastating the West. "It would seem that in the 21st century, it is somehow frivolous to talk about 'only allies—army and navy', because that can only be said about a closed state walled off from the whole world. With all due respect to the emperor, his statement is long outdated and today can perhaps only apply to North Korea, where there is neither the internet nor a financial crisis", he wrote.
