= Alexander III of Russia =

Emperor of Russia from 1881 to 1894

Alexander III
- King of Poland; Grand Duke of Finland
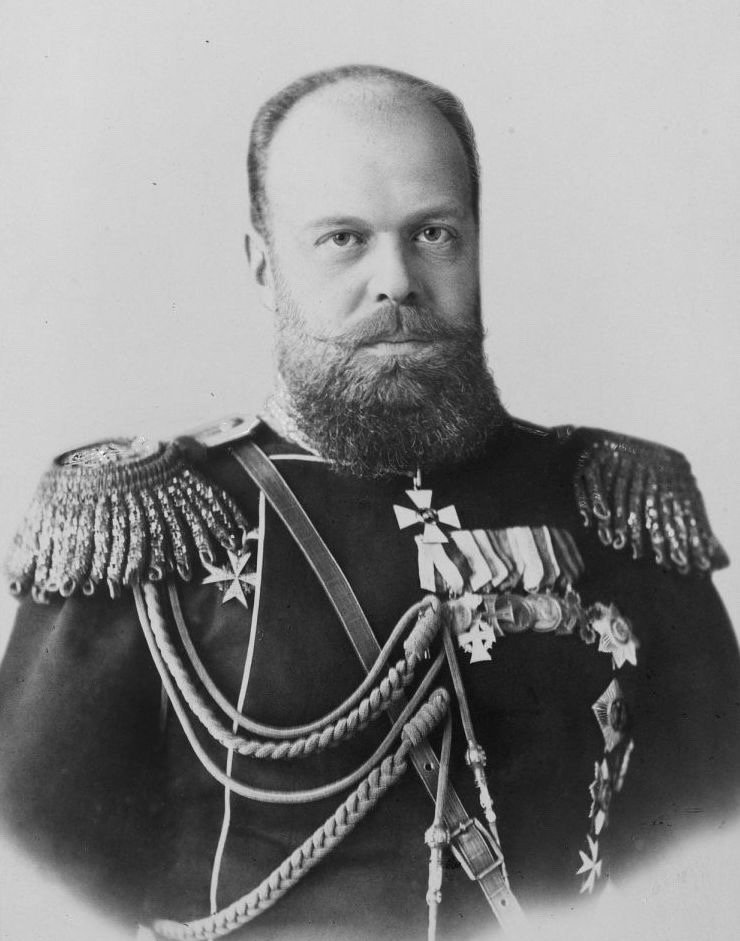
- Portrait photograph by Sergey Levitsky, 1885

Emperor of Russia
- Reign: 13 March 1881 – 1 November 1894
- Coronation: 27 May 1883
- Predecessor: Alexander II
- Successor: Nicholas II
- Born: 10 March 1845; Winter Palace, Saint Petersburg, Russia
- Died: 19 November 1894 (aged 49); Maley Palace, Livadia, Russia
- Burial: 18 November 1894; Peter and Paul Cathedral, Saint Petersburg
- Spouse: Dagmar of Denmark (m. 1866)
- Issue Detail: Nicholas II; Grand Duke Alexander; Grand Duke George; Grand Duchess Xenia; Grand Duke Michael; Grand Duchess Olga
Names
- Alexander Alexandrovich Romanov
- House: Holstein-Gottorp-Romanov
- Father: Alexander II of Russia
- Mother: Marie of Hesse and by Rhine
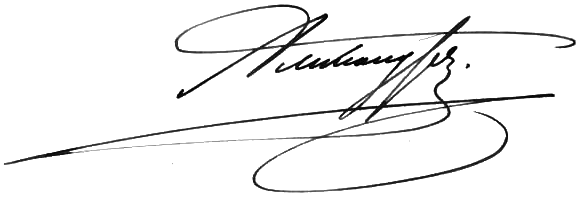
- Signature

Alexander III (Russian: Александр III Александрович, romanized: Aleksandr III Aleksandrovich; 10 March 1845 – 19 November 1894) was Emperor of Russia, King of Poland and Grand Duke of Finland from 13 March 1881 until his death in 1894. He was highly reactionary in domestic affairs and reversed some of the liberal reforms of his father, Alexander II, a policy of "counter-reforms" (Russian: контрреформы).

During his reign, Russia fought no major wars, and he came to be known as The Peacemaker (Russian: Царь-Миротворец, romanized: Tsar'-Mirotvorets Russian pronunciation: [t͡sarʲ mʲɪrɐˈtvorʲɪt͡s]), a laudatory title enduring into 21st-century historiography. His major foreign policy achievement was the Franco-Russian Alliance, a major shift in international relations that eventually embroiled Russia in World War I. His political legacy represented a direct challenge to the European cultural order set forth by German statesman Otto von Bismarck, intermingling Russian influences with the shifting balances of power.

== Early life ==
Grand Duke Alexander Alexandrovich was born on 10 March 1845 at the Winter Palace in Saint Petersburg, Russian Empire, the second son and third child of Tsesarevich Alexander (the future Alexander II) and his first wife Maria Alexandrovna (née Princess Marie of Hesse and by Rhine). He was born during the reign of his grandfather Nicholas I.

Though he was destined to be a strongly counter-reforming emperor, Alexander had little prospect of succeeding to the throne during the first two decades of his life, as he had an elder brother, Nicholas, who seemed of robust constitution. Even when Nicholas first displayed symptoms of delicate health, the notion that he might die young was never taken seriously, and he was betrothed to Princess Dagmar of Denmark, daughter of King Christian IX of Denmark and Queen Louise of Denmark, whose siblings included King Frederik VIII of Denmark, Queen Alexandra of the United Kingdom and King George I of Greece. Great solicitude was devoted to the education of Nicholas as tsesarevich, whereas Alexander received only the training of an ordinary Grand Duke of that period. This included acquaintance with French, English and German, and military drill.

== As Tsesarevich ==
Alexander became tsesarevich upon Nicholas's sudden death in 1865. He had been very close to his older brother, and he was devastated. When he became tsar, he reflected that "no one had such an impact on my life as my dear brother and friend Nixa [Nicholas]" and lamented that "a terrible responsibility fell on my shoulders" when Nicholas died.

As tsesarevich, Alexander began to study the principles of law and administration under Konstantin Pobedonostsev, then a professor of civil law at Moscow State University and later (from 1880) chief procurator of the Most Holy Synod of the Orthodox Church in Russia. Pobedonostsev instilled into the young man's mind the belief that zeal for Russian Orthodox thought was an essential factor of Russian patriotism to be cultivated by every right-minded emperor. While he was heir apparent from 1865 to 1881 Alexander did not play a prominent part in public affairs, but allowed it to become known that he had ideas which did not coincide with the principles of the existing government.

On his deathbed, Nicholas allegedly expressed the wish that his fiancée, Princess Dagmar of Denmark, should marry Alexander. Alexander's parents encouraged the match. On 2 June 1866, Alexander went to Copenhagen to visit Dagmar. When they were looking at photographs of the deceased Nicholas, Alexander proposed to Dagmar. On 9 November [O.S. 28 October] 1866 in the Grand Church of the Winter Palace in St. Petersburg, Alexander wed Dagmar, who converted to Orthodox Christianity and took the name Maria Feodorovna. The union proved a happy one to the end; unlike many of his predecessors since Peter I, there was no adultery in his marriage.

Alexander and his father became estranged due to their different political views. In 1870, Alexander II supported Prussia in the Franco-Prussian War, which angered the younger Alexander. Influenced by his Danish wife, Dagmar, Alexander criticized the "shortsighted government" for helping the "Prussian pigs".

Alexander resented his father for having a long-standing relationship with Princess Catherine Dolgorukova (with whom he had several illegitimate children) while his mother, the Empress, was suffering from chronic ill-health. Two days after Empress Marie died, his father told him, "I shall live as I wish, and my union with Princess Dolgorukova is definite" but assured him that "your rights will be safeguarded." Alexander was furious over his father's decision to marry Catherine a month after his mother's death, which he believed "forever ruined all the dear good memories of family life." His father threatened to disinherit him if he left court out of protest against the marriage. He privately denounced Catherine as "the outsider" and complained that she was "designing and immature". After his father's assassination, he reflected that his father's marriage to Catherine had caused the tragedy: "All the scum burst out and swallowed all that was holy. The guardian angel flew away and everything turned to ashes, finally culminating in the dreadful incomprehensible 1 March."

== Reign ==
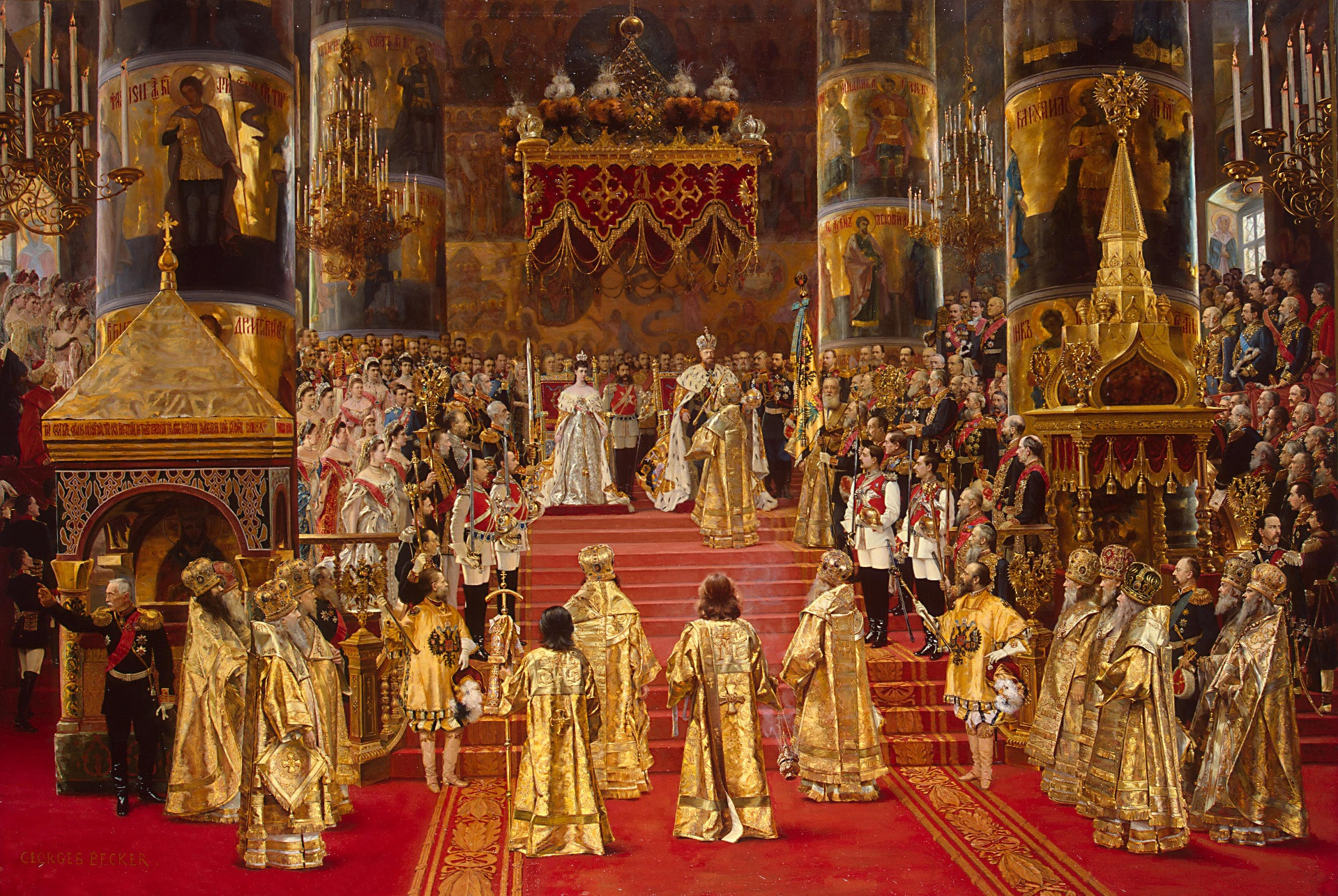
Grand painting by artist Georges Becker of the coronation of Emperor Alexander III and Empress Maria Fyodorovna, which took place on 27 May [O.S. 15 May] 1883 at the Uspensky Sobor of the Moscow Kremlin. On the left of the dais can be seen his young son and heir, the Tsarevich Nicholas, and behind Nicholas can be seen a young Grand Duke George.

On 13 March 1881 (N.S.) Alexander's father, Alexander II, was assassinated by members of the organization Narodnaya Volya. As a result, Alexander ascended to the Russian imperial throne in the village of Nennal. He and Maria Feodorovna were officially crowned and anointed at the Assumption Cathedral in Moscow on 27 May 1883. Alexander's ascension to the throne was followed by an outbreak of anti-Jewish riots.

Alexander III disliked the extravagance of the rest of his family. It was also expensive for the Crown to pay so many grand dukes each year. Each one received an annual salary of 250,000 rubles, and grand duchesses received a dowry of a million rubles when they married. He limited the title of grand duke and duchess to only children and male-line grandchildren of emperors. The rest would bear a princely title and the style of Serene Highness. He also forbade morganatic marriages, as well as those outside of the Orthodox Church.

=== Domestic policies ===
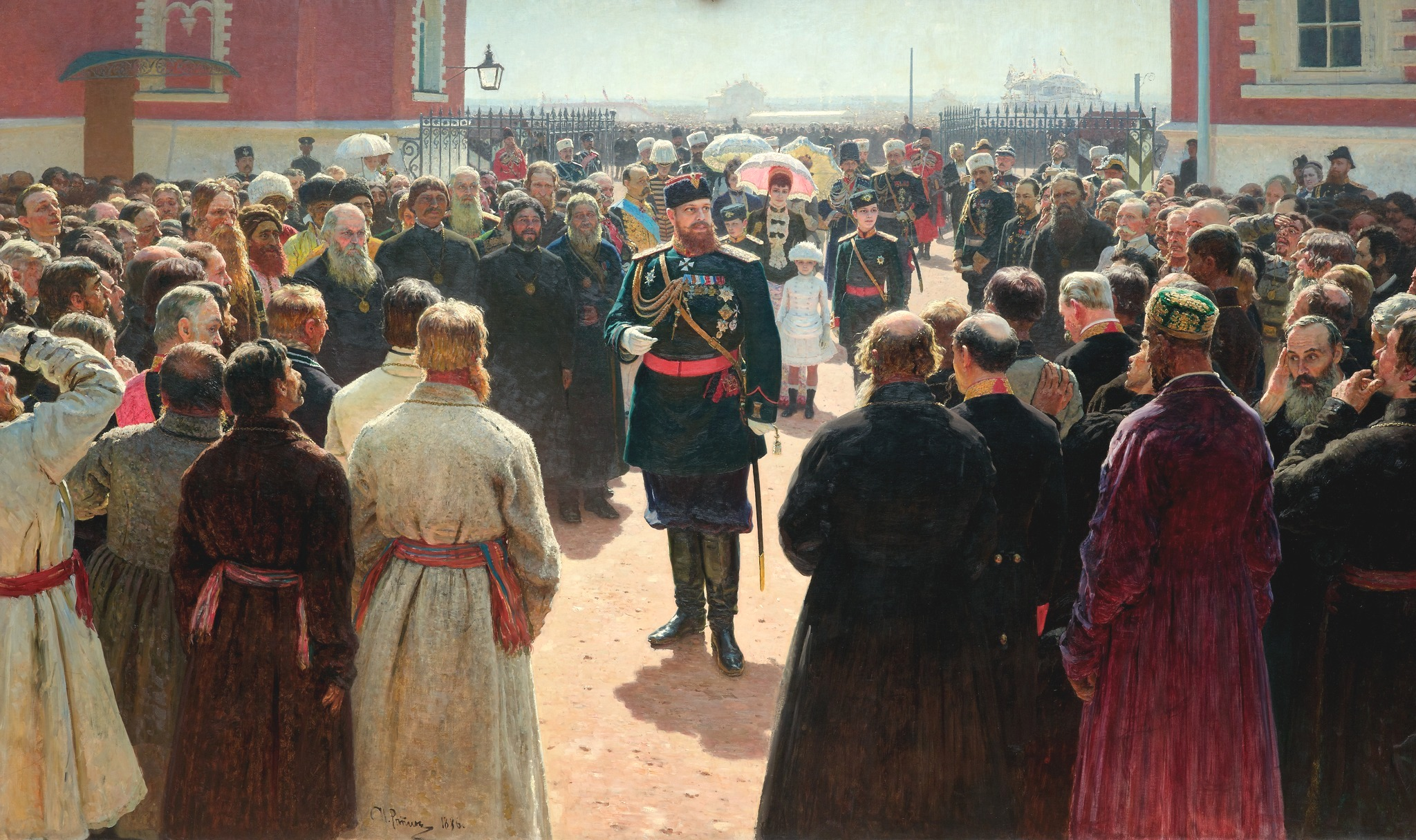
Alexander receiving rural district elders in the yard of Petrovsky Palace in Moscow; painting by Ilya Repin

On the day of his assassination, Alexander II signed an ukaz setting up consultative commissions to advise the monarch. On ascending to the throne, however, Alexander III took Pobedonostsev's advice and cancelled the policy before its publication. He made it clear that his autocracy would not be limited.

All of Alexander III's internal reforms aimed to reverse the liberalization from his father's reign. The new Emperor believed that the principles of Orthodoxy, Autocracy, and Nationality, introduced by his grandfather Nicholas I, would quell revolutionary agitation and save Russia.

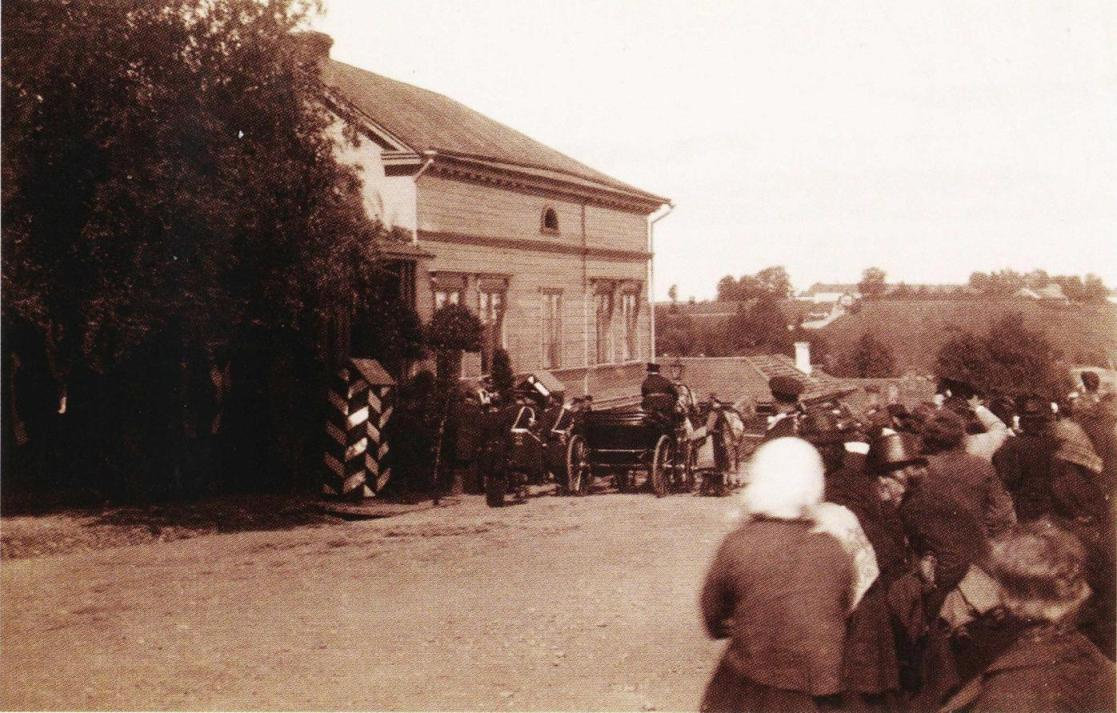
Alexander III arriving at Fontell House (also known as "The House of Emperor") for the first time on 4 August 1885, in Lappeenranta, Finland.

Alexander weakened the power of the zemstvo (elective local administrative bodies) and placed the administration of peasant communes under the supervision of land-owning proprietors appointed by his government, "land captains" (zemskiye nachalniki). This weakened the nobility and peasantry and strengthened the Emperor's personal control. In such policies Alexander III followed the advice of Konstantin Pobedonostsev, who retained control of the Church in Russia through his long tenure as Procurator of the Holy Synod (from 1880 to 1905) and who became tutor to Alexander's son and heir, Nicholas. (Pobedonostsev appears as "Toporov" in Tolstoy's novel Resurrection.) Other conservative advisors included Count Dmitry Tolstoy (as minister of education, and later of internal affairs) and Ivan Durnovo (Tolstoy's successor in the latter post). Journalists such as Mikhail Katkov supported the emperor's autocracy policies.

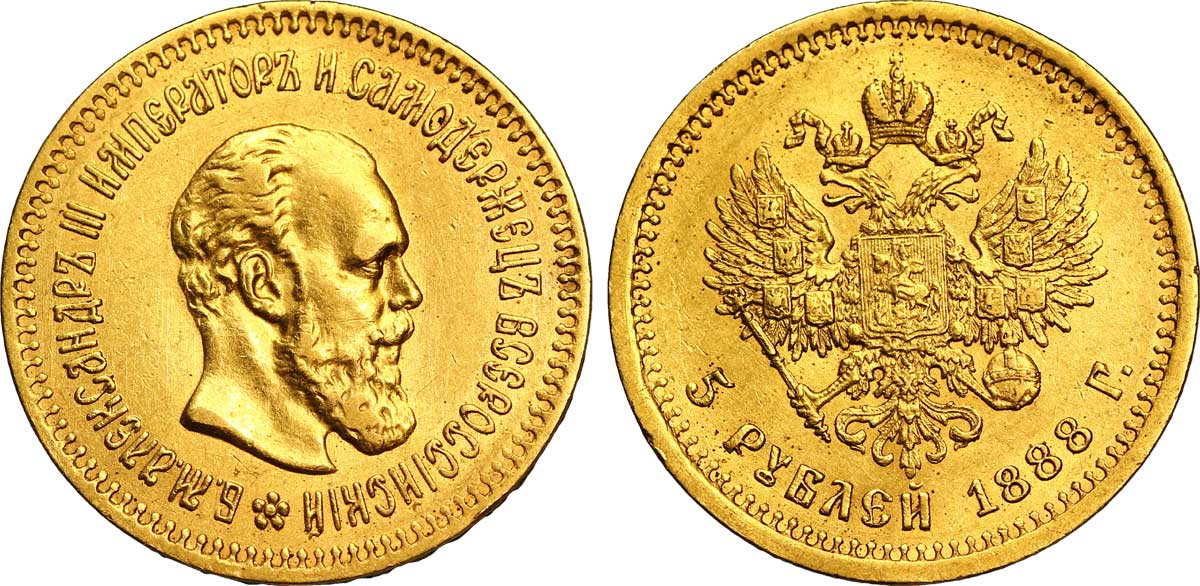
5-ruble coin of Alexander III, 1888

The government was overwhelmed in dealing with the Russian famine of 1891–92 and the ensuing cholera epidemic, which caused 375,000 to 500,000 deaths, and some liberal activity was tolerated, and the zemstvos were recruited to help with relief. Among others, Leo Tolstoy helped with relief efforts on his estate and through the British press, and Chekhov directed anti-cholera precautions in several villages.

Alexander had the political goal of Russification, which involved homogenizing the language and religion of Russia's people. He implemented changes such as teaching only the Russian language in Russian schools in Germany, Poland, and Finland. He also patronized Eastern Orthodoxy and dissolved German, Polish, and Swedish cultural and religious institutions.

Alexander was hostile to Jews, and his reign witnessed a sharp deterioration in their economic, social, and political condition. His policy was eagerly implemented by tsarist officials in the May Laws of 1882. These laws encouraged open anti-Jewish sentiment and dozens of pogroms across the western part of the empire. As a result, many Jews emigrated to Western Europe and the United States. The laws banned Jews from inhabiting rural areas and shtetls (even within the Pale of Settlement) and restricted the occupations in which they could engage.

Encouraged by its successful assassination of Alexander II, the Narodnaya Volya movement began planning the murder of Alexander III. The Okhrana uncovered the plot and five of the conspirators, including Aleksandr Ulyanov, the older brother of Vladimir Lenin, were captured and hanged in May 1887.

=== Foreign policy ===
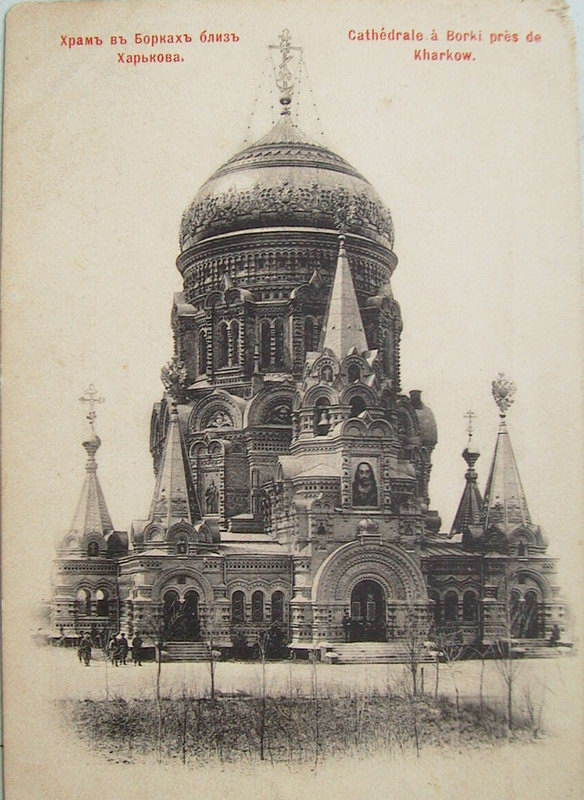
The Borki Cathedral was one of many churches built to commemorate the Tsar's miraculous survival in the 1888 train crash

The general negative consensus about the tsar's foreign policy follows the conclusions of the British Prime Minister Lord Salisbury in 1885:

It is very difficult to come to any satisfactory conclusion as to the real objects of Russian policy. I am more inclined to believe there are none; that the Emperor is really his own Minister, and so bad a Minister that no consequent or coherent policy is pursued; but that each influential person, military or civil, snatches from him as opportunity offers the decisions which such person at the moment wants and that the mutual effect of these decisions on each other is determined almost exclusively by chance.

In foreign affairs Alexander III was a man of peace, but not at any price, and held that the best means of averting war is to be well-prepared for it. Diplomat Nikolay Girs, scion of a rich and powerful family, served as his Foreign Minister from 1882 to 1895 and established the peaceful policies for which Alexander has been given credit. Girs was an architect of the Franco-Russian Alliance of 1892, which was later expanded into the Triple Entente with the addition of Great Britain. That alliance brought France out of diplomatic isolation, and moved Russia from the German orbit to a coalition with France, one that was strongly supported by French financial assistance to Russia's economic modernisation. Girs was in charge of a diplomacy that featured numerous negotiated settlements, treaties and conventions. These agreements defined Russian boundaries and restored equilibrium to dangerously unstable situations. The most dramatic success came in 1885, settling long-standing tensions with Great Britain, which was fearful that Russian expansion to the south would be a threat to India. Girs was usually successful in restraining the aggressive inclinations of Tsar Alexander convincing him that the very survival of the Tsarist system depended on avoiding major wars. With a deep insight into the tsar's moods and views, Girs was usually able to shape the final decisions by outmaneuvering hostile journalists, ministers, and even the Tsarina, as well as his own ambassadors.

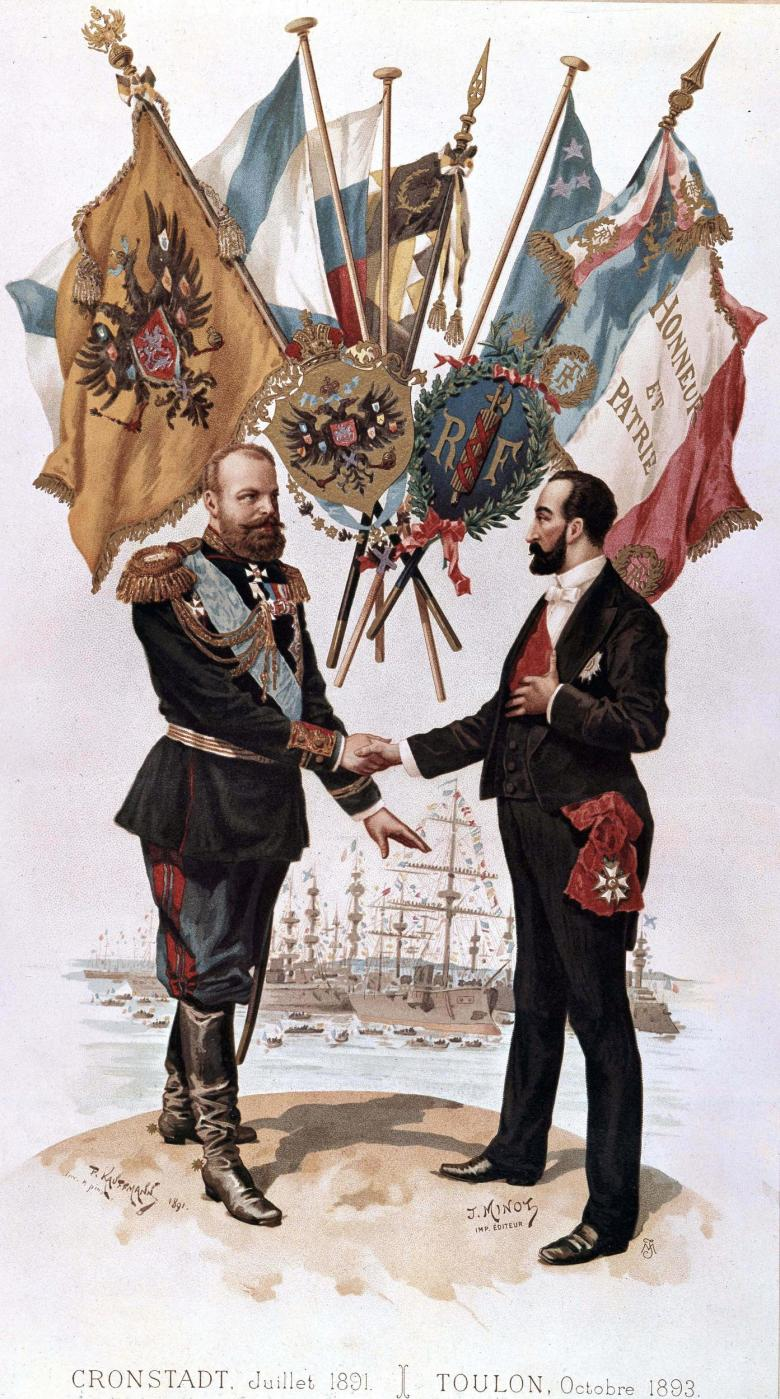
Alexander III and French President Marie François Sadi Carnot forge an alliance

Though Alexander was indignant at the conduct of German chancellor Otto von Bismarck towards Russia, he avoided an open rupture with Germany—even reviving the League of Three Emperors for a period of time and in 1887, signed the Reinsurance Treaty with the Germans. However, in 1890, the expiration of the treaty coincided with the dismissal of Bismarck by the new German emperor, Kaiser Wilhelm II (for whom the Tsar had an immense dislike), and the unwillingness of Wilhelm II's government to renew the treaty. In response Alexander III then began cordial relations with France, eventually entering into an alliance with the French in 1892.

Despite chilly relations with Berlin, the Tsar nevertheless confined himself to keeping a large number of troops near the German frontier. With regard to Bulgaria he exercised similar self-control. The efforts of Prince Alexander and afterwards of Stambolov to destroy Russian influence in the principality roused his indignation, but he vetoed all proposals to intervene by force of arms.

In Central Asian affairs he followed the traditional policy of gradually extending Russian domination without provoking conflict with the United Kingdom (see Panjdeh incident), and he never allowed the bellicose partisans of a forward policy to get out of hand. His reign cannot be regarded as an eventful period of Russian history; but under his hard rule the country made considerable progress.

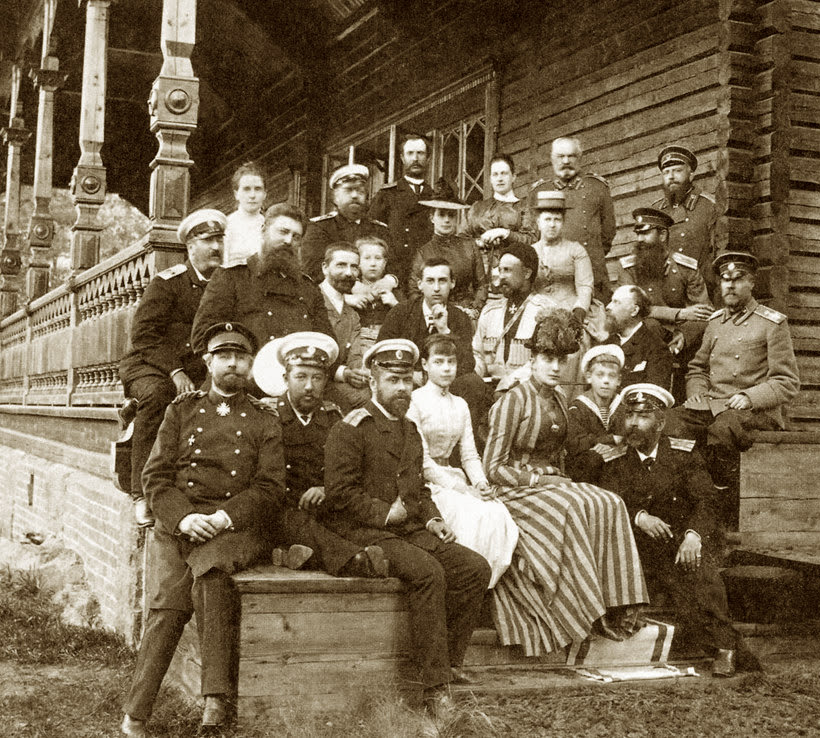
Alexander III and Maria Feodorovna in the family circle on the porch of his home in Langinkoski, Finland in summer 1889.

Alexander and his wife regularly spent their summers at Langinkoski manor along the Kymi River near Kotka on the Finnish coast, where their children were immersed in a Nordic lifestyle.

Alexander rejected foreign influence, German influence in particular, thus the adoption of local national principles was deprecated in all spheres of official activity, with a view to realizing his ideal of a Russia homogeneous in language, administration and religion. These ideas conflicted with those of his father, who had German sympathies despite being a patriot; Alexander II often used the German language in his private relations, occasionally ridiculed the Slavophiles and based his foreign policy on the Prussian alliance.

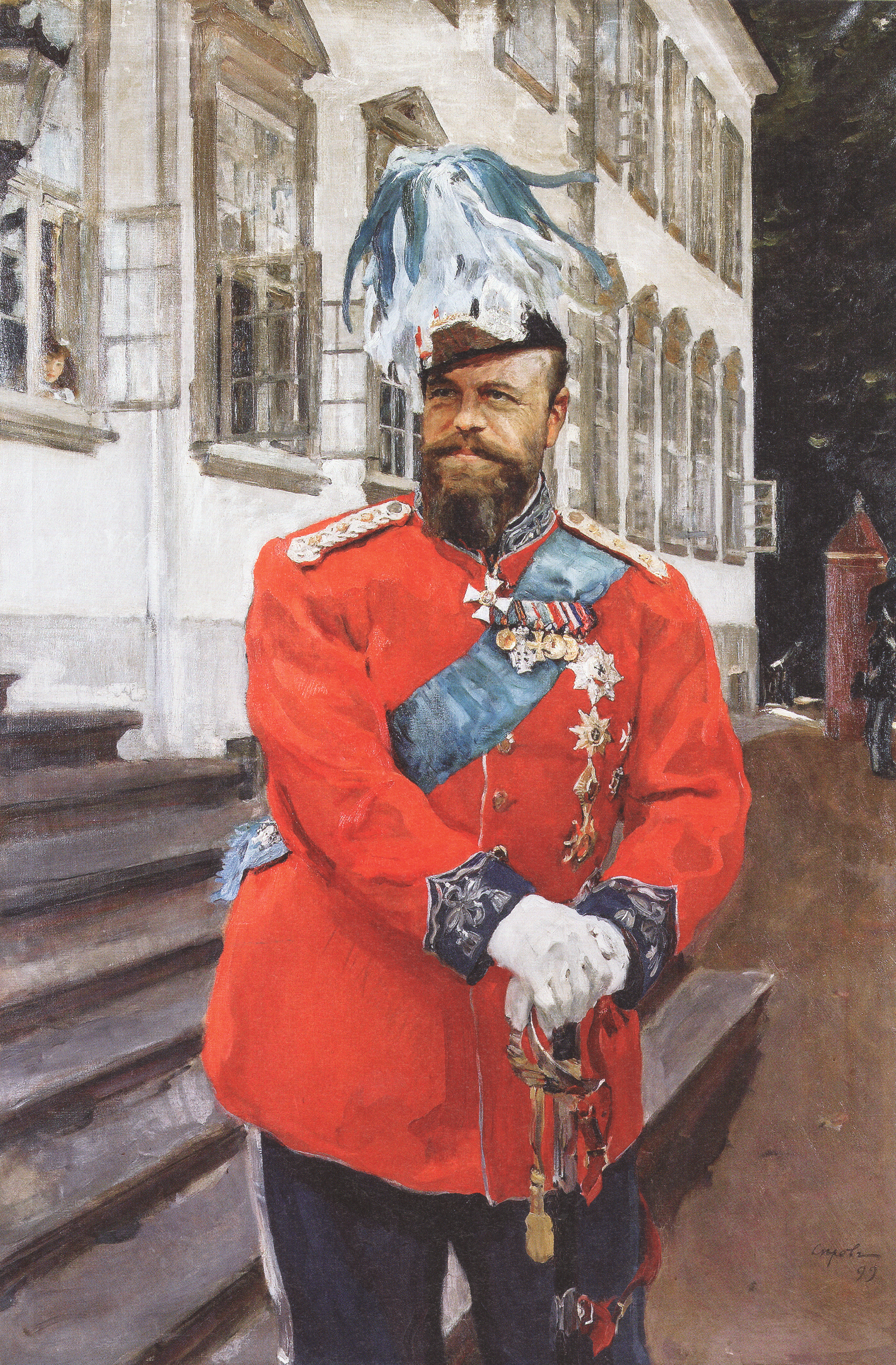
Alexander III in the uniform of the Danish Royal Life Guards, 1894

Some differences between father and son had first appeared during the Franco-Prussian War, when Alexander II supported the cabinet of Berlin while the Tsesarevich made no effort to conceal his sympathies for the French. These sentiments would resurface during 1875–1879, when the Eastern question excited Russian society. At first, the Tsesarevich was more Slavophile than the Russian government. However, his phlegmatic nature restrained him from many exaggerations, and any popular illusions he may have imbibed were dispelled by personal observation in Bulgaria where he commanded the left wing of the invading army. Never consulted on political questions, Alexander confined himself to military duties and fulfilled them in a conscientious and unobtrusive manner. After many mistakes and disappointments, the army reached Constantinople and the Treaty of San Stefano was signed, but much that had been obtained by that important document had to be sacrificed at the Congress of Berlin.

Bismarck failed to do what was expected of him by the Russian emperor. In return for the Russian support which had enabled him to create the German Empire, it was thought that he would help Russia to solve the Eastern question in accordance with Russian interests, but to the surprise and indignation of the cabinet of Saint Petersburg he confined himself to acting the part of "honest broker" at the Congress, and shortly afterwards contracted an alliance with Austria-Hungary for the purpose of counteracting Russian designs in Eastern Europe.

The Tsesarevich could refer to these results as confirmation of the views he had expressed during the Franco-Prussian War; he concluded that for Russia, the best thing was to recover as quickly as possible from her temporary exhaustion, and prepare for future contingencies by military and naval reorganization. In accordance with this conviction, he suggested that certain reforms should be introduced.

=== Trade and industry ===
Alexander III took initiatives to stimulate the development of trade and industry, as his father did before him. Russia's economy was still challenged by the Russian-Turkish war of 1877–1878, which created a deficit, so he imposed customs duties on imported goods. To further alleviate the budget deficit, he implemented increased frugality and accounting in state finances. Industrial development increased during his reign. Also during his reign, construction of the Trans-Siberian Railway was started.

=== Family life ===
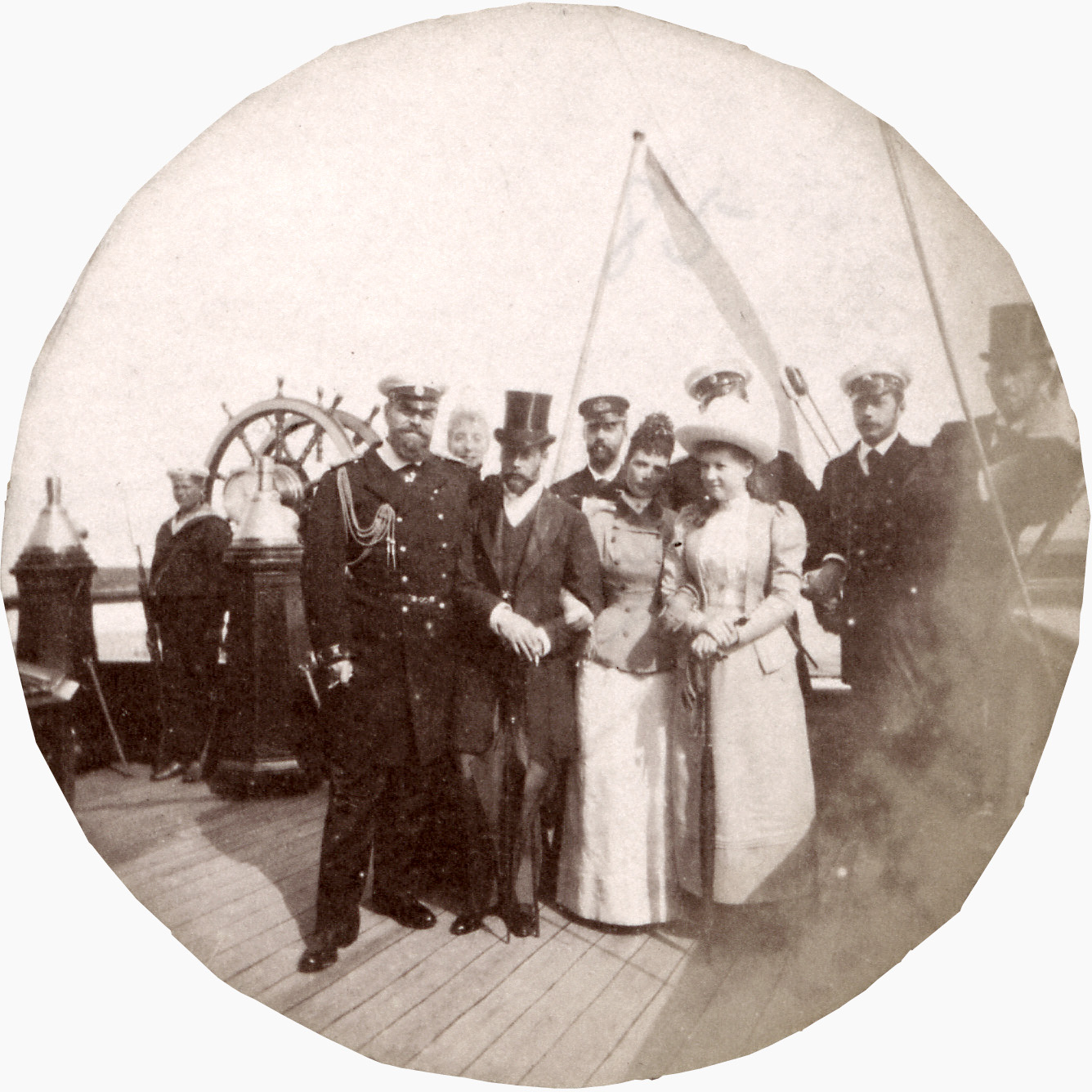
Left to Right: Emperor Alexander III, Prince George (later George V of the United Kingdom), Marie Feodorovna, Maria of Greece, Tsesarevich Nicholas (later Emperor Nicholas II of Russia). Probably taken on the imperial yacht near Denmark, c. 1893.

Following his father's assassination, Alexander III was advised that it would be difficult for him to be kept safe at the Winter Palace, and he relocated his family to the Gatchina Palace 30 kilometres (20 mi) south of St. Petersburg. The palace was surrounded by moats, watch towers, and trenches, and soldiers were on guard night and day. Under heavy guard, he would make occasional visits into St. Petersburg, but even then he would stay in the Anichkov Palace, not the Winter Palace. Alexander resented having to take refuge at Gatchina. Grand Duke Alexander Mikhailovich remembered hearing the tsar say, "To think that after having faced the guns of the Turks I must retreat now before these skunks."

In the 1860s, Alexander fell in love with his mother's lady-in-waiting, Princess Maria Elimovna Meshcherskaya. Dismayed to learn that Prince zu Sayn-Wittgenstein-Sayn had proposed to her in early 1866, he told his parents that he was prepared to give up his rights of succession in order to marry his beloved "Dusenka". In 1866 after tsesarevich Nicholas's death, tsar Alexander II informed the new tsesarevich Alexander that Russia had come to a marriage agreement with the parents of Princess Dagmar of Denmark, who had been Nicholas' fiancée. Initially, the tsesarevich refused to travel to Copenhagen because he wanted to marry Maria. Enraged, the tsar ordered him to go straight to Denmark and propose to Princess Dagmar. The young Alexander wrote in his diary "Farewell, dear Dusenka."

Despite his initial reluctance, Alexander grew fond of Dagmar, by the end of his life they loved each other deeply. A few weeks after their wedding, he wrote in his diary: "God grant that... I may love my darling wife more and more... I often feel that I am not worthy of her, but even if this was true, I will do my best to be." When she left his side, he missed her bitterly and complained: "My sweet darling Minny, for five years we've never been apart and Gatchina is empty and sad without you." In 1885, he commissioned Peter Carl Fabergé to produce the first jeweled Easter eggs for her, and she was so delighted that Alexander gave her an egg every Easter. After Alexander died, his heir Nicholas doubled the tradition, every Easter commissioning an egg for his wife Alexandra Feodorovna, and one for his mother Dagmar. When Dagmar nursed him in his final illness, Alexander told her, "Even before my death, I have known an angel." He died in Dagmar's arms, and his daughter Olga wrote that "my mother still held him in her arms" long after he died.

Alexander had six children by Dagmar, five of whom survived into adulthood: Nicholas (b. 1868), George (b. 1871), Xenia (b. 1875), Michael (b. 1878) and Olga (b. 1882). He told Dagmar that "only with [our children] can I relax mentally, enjoy them and rejoice, looking at them." He wrote in his diary that he "was crying like a baby" when Dagmar gave birth to their first child, Nicholas. He was much more lenient with his children than most European monarchs, and he told their tutors, "I do not need porcelain, I want normal healthy Russian children." General Cherevin believed that the clever George was "the favourite of both parents". Alexander enjoyed a more informal relationship with his youngest son Michael and doted on his youngest daughter, Olga.

Alexander was concerned that his heir-apparent, Nicholas, was too gentle and naive to become an effective Emperor. When Witte suggested that Nicholas participate in the Trans-Siberian Committee, Alexander said, "Have you ever tried to discuss anything of consequence with His Imperial Highness the Grand Duke? Don't tell me you never noticed the Grand Duke is ... an absolute child. His opinions are utterly childish. How could he preside over such a committee?" He was worried that Nicholas had no experiences with women and arranged for the Polish ballerina Mathilde Kschessinskaya to become his son's mistress. Even at the end of his life, he considered Nicholas a child and told him, "I can't imagine you as a fiancé – how strange and unusual!"

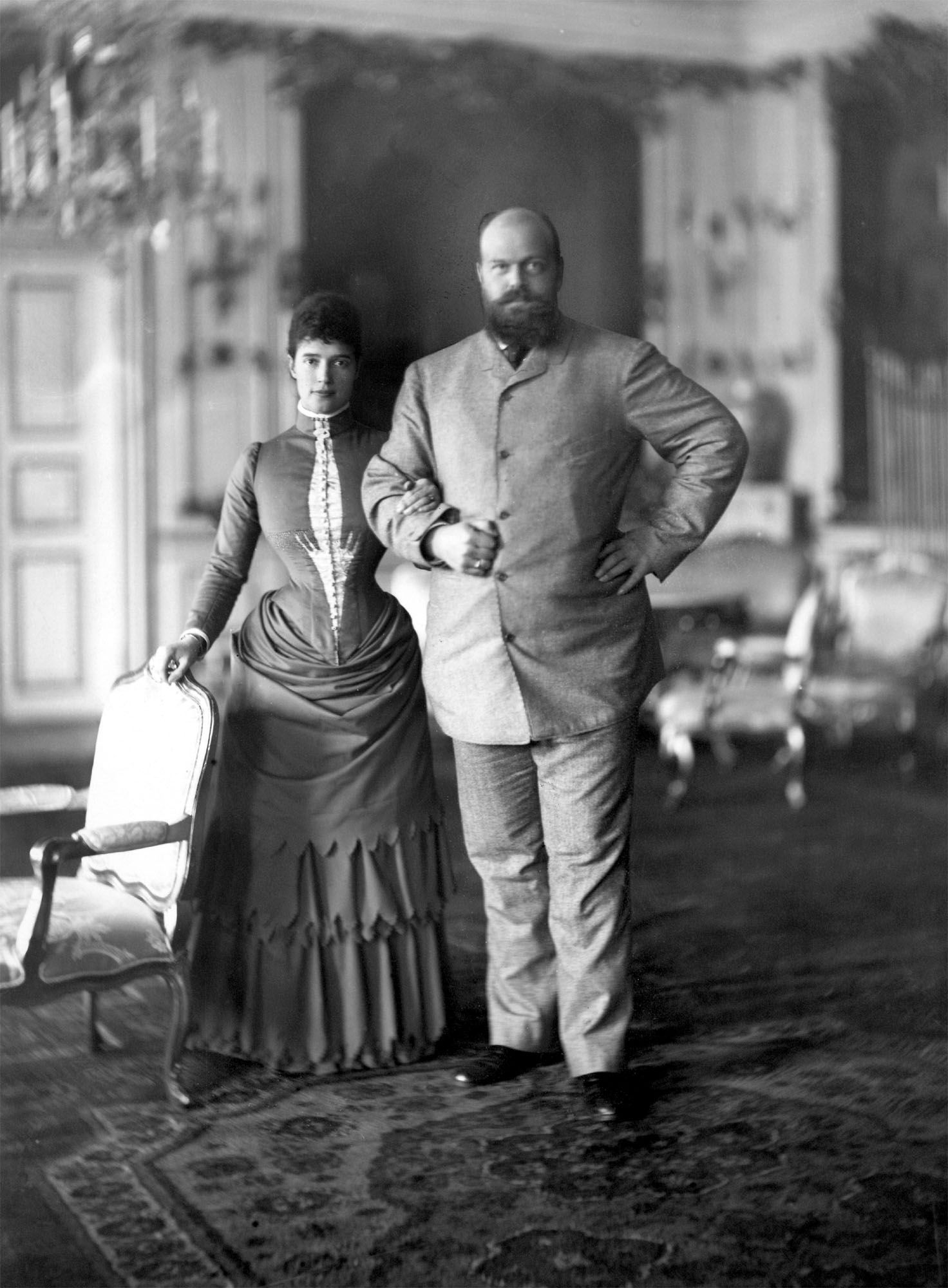
Alexander and his wife Empress Maria Fyodorovna on holiday in Copenhagen in 1893.

Each summer his parents-in-law, King Christian IX and Queen Louise, held family reunions at the Danish royal palaces of Fredensborg and Bernstorff, bringing Alexander, Maria and their children to Denmark. His sister-in-law, the Princess of Wales, would come from Great Britain with some of her children, and his brother-in-law and cousin-in-law, King George I of Greece, his wife, Queen Olga, who was a first cousin of Alexander and a Romanov Grand Duchess by birth, came with their children from Athens. In contrast to the strict security observed in Russia, Alexander and Maria revelled in the relative freedom that they enjoyed in Denmark, Alexander once commenting to the Prince and Princess of Wales near the end of a visit that he envied them being able to return to a happy home in England, while he was returning to his Russian prison. In Denmark, he was able to enjoy joining his children, nephews and nieces, in muddy ponds looking for tadpoles, sneaking into his father-in-law's orchard to steal apples, and playing pranks, such as turning a water hose on the visiting King Oscar II of Sweden.

Alexander had an extremely poor relationship with his brother Grand Duke Vladimir. At a restaurant, Vladimir had brawled with the French actor Lucien Guitry when the latter kissed his wife, Duchess Marie of Mecklenburg-Schwerin. The prefect of St. Petersburg needed to escort Vladimir out of the restaurant. Alexander was so furious that he temporarily exiled Vladimir and his wife and threatened to exile them permanently to Siberia. When Alexander and his family survived the Borki train disaster in 1888, Alexander joked, "I can imagine how disappointed Vladimir is going to be when he learns that we all stayed alive!" This tension was reflected in the rivalry between Maria Feodorovna and Vladimir's wife Marie Pavlovna.

Alexander had better relationships with his other brothers Alexei (who he made rear admiral and then grand admiral of the Russian Navy), Sergei (who he made governor of Moscow) and Paul.

Despite the antipathy that Alexander had towards his stepmother, Catherine Dolgorukov, he nevertheless allowed her to remain in the Winter Palace for some time after his father's assassination and to retain keepsakes such as Alexander II's blood-soaked uniform and his reading glasses.

Even though he disliked their mother, Alexander was kind to his half-siblings. His youngest half-sister Princess Catherine Alexandrovna Yurievskaya remembered when he would play with her and her siblings: "The Emperor... seemed a playful and kind Goliath among all the romping children."

On 29 October [O.S. 17 October] 1888 the Imperial train derailed in an accident at Borki. At the moment of the crash, the imperial family was in the dining car. Its roof collapsed, and Alexander held its remains on his shoulders as the children fled outdoors. The onset of Alexander's kidney failure was later attributed to the blunt trauma suffered in this incident.

== Illness and death ==
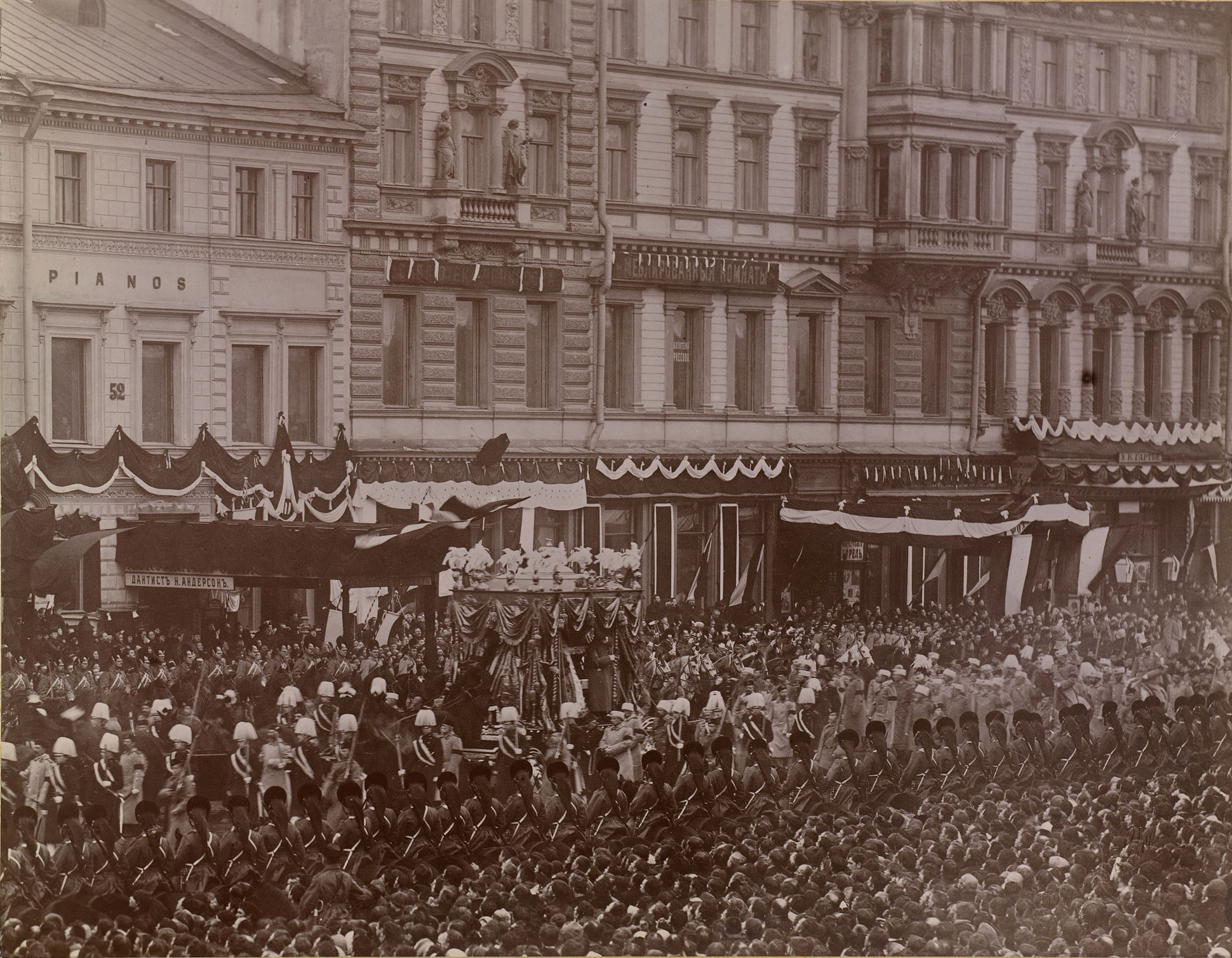
Funeral procession of Tsar Alexander III, (1894)

In 1894, Alexander III became ill with terminal kidney disease (nephritis). His first cousin Queen Olga of Greece offered to let him stay at her villa Mon Repos, on the island of Corfu, in the hope that it might improve the Tsar's condition. By the time that they reached Crimea, they stayed at the Maly Palace in Livadia, (Note: Modern-day Livadiya, Crimea) as Alexander was too weak to travel any farther. Recognizing that the Tsar's days were numbered, various imperial relatives began to descend on Livadia. Clergyman John of Kronstadt paid a visit and administered Communion to the Tsar. On 21 October, Alexander received Nicholas's fiancée, Princess Alix of Hesse-Darmstadt, who had come from her native Darmstadt to receive the Tsar's blessing. Despite being exceedingly weak, Alexander insisted on receiving Alix in full dress uniform, an event that left him exhausted. Soon after, his health began to deteriorate more rapidly. He died in the arms of his wife, and in the presence of his physician, Ernst Viktor von Leyden, at Maly Palace in Livadia on the afternoon of 1 November [O.S. 20 October] 1894 at the age of 49, and was succeeded by his eldest son Tsesarevich Nicholas, who took the throne as Nicholas II. After leaving Livadia on 6 November and traveling to St. Petersburg by way of Moscow, his remains were interred on 18 November at the Peter and Paul Fortress, with his funeral being attended by numerous foreign relatives, including King Christian IX of Denmark, the Prince and Princess of Wales, and Duke of York, and Duke and Duchess of Saxe-Coburg-Gotha, and his daughter-in-law to be, Alix of Hesse, and her brother, Grand Duke Ernst Ludwig of Hesse.

== Personality ==
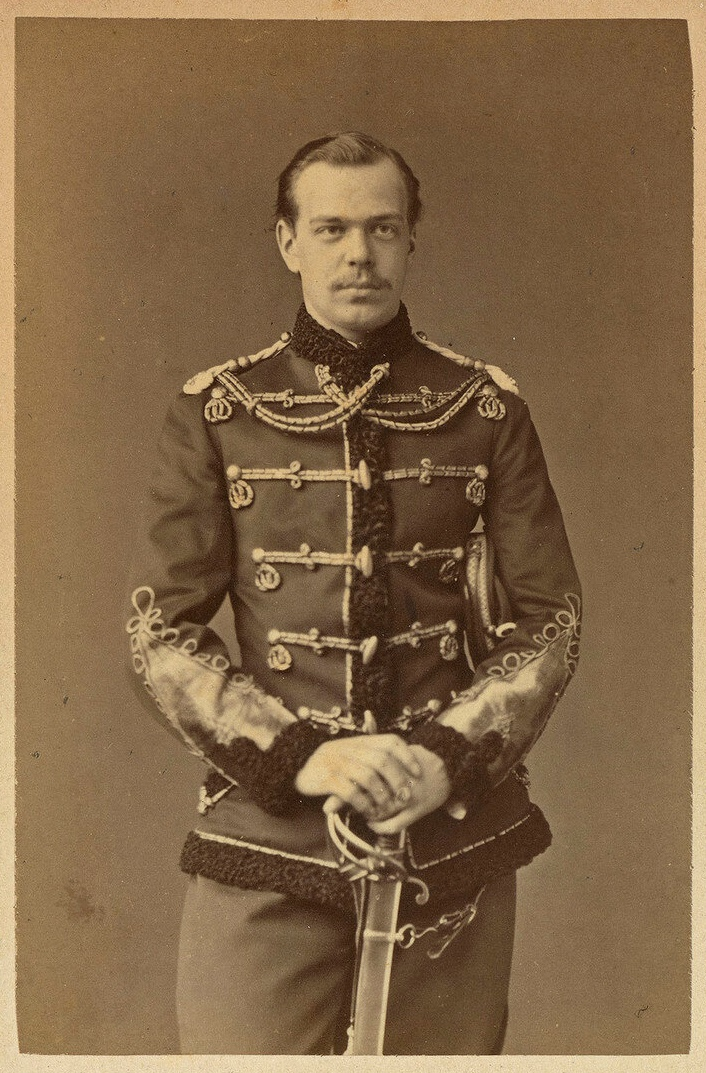
Alexander III as Tsesarevich, by Sergei Lvovich Levitsky, 1865

In disposition, Alexander bore little resemblance to his soft-hearted, liberal father, and still less to his refined, philosophic, sentimental, chivalrous, yet cunning great-uncle Emperor Alexander I. Although an enthusiastic amateur musician and patron of the ballet, Alexander was seen as lacking refinement and elegance. Indeed, he rather relished the idea of being of the same rough texture as some of his subjects. His straightforward, abrupt manner savoured sometimes of gruffness, while his direct style of expression matched his rough-hewn, immobile features and somewhat sluggish movements. His education was not such as to soften these peculiarities.

Alexander was extremely strong. He tore packs of cards in half with his bare hands to entertain his children. When the Austrian ambassador threatened that Austria would mobilize two or three army corps against Russia, he twisted a silver fork into a knot and threw it onto the plate of the ambassador. He said, "That is what I am going to do to your two or three army corps."

Unlike his extroverted wife, Alexander disliked social functions and avoided St. Petersburg. At palace balls, he was impatient for the events to end. He would order each musician of the orchestra to leave and turn off the lights until the guests left.

After an unpleasant childhood experience on a bad-tempered mount, he developed a lifelong fear of horses. His wife once convinced him to go on a carriage ride with her, but as he reluctantly entered the carriage, the ponies reared back. He immediately left the carriage and no amount of pleading from his wife could convince him to get back in.

An account from the memoirs of the artist Alexander Benois gives one impression of Alexander III:

After a performance of the ballet Tsar Kandavl at the Mariinsky Theatre, I first caught sight of the Emperor. I was struck by the size of the man, and although cumbersome and heavy, he was still a mighty figure. There was indeed something of the muzhik [Russian peasant] about him. The look of his bright eyes made quite an impression on me. As he passed where I was standing, he raised his head for a second, and to this day I can remember what I felt as our eyes met. It was a look as cold as steel, in which there was something threatening, even frightening, and it struck me like a blow. The Tsar's gaze! The look of a man who stood above all others, but who carried a monstrous burden and who every minute had to fear for his life and the lives of those closest to him. In later years I came into contact with the Emperor on several occasions, and I felt not the slightest bit timid. In more ordinary cases Tsar Alexander III could be at once kind, simple, and even almost homely.

== Monuments ==
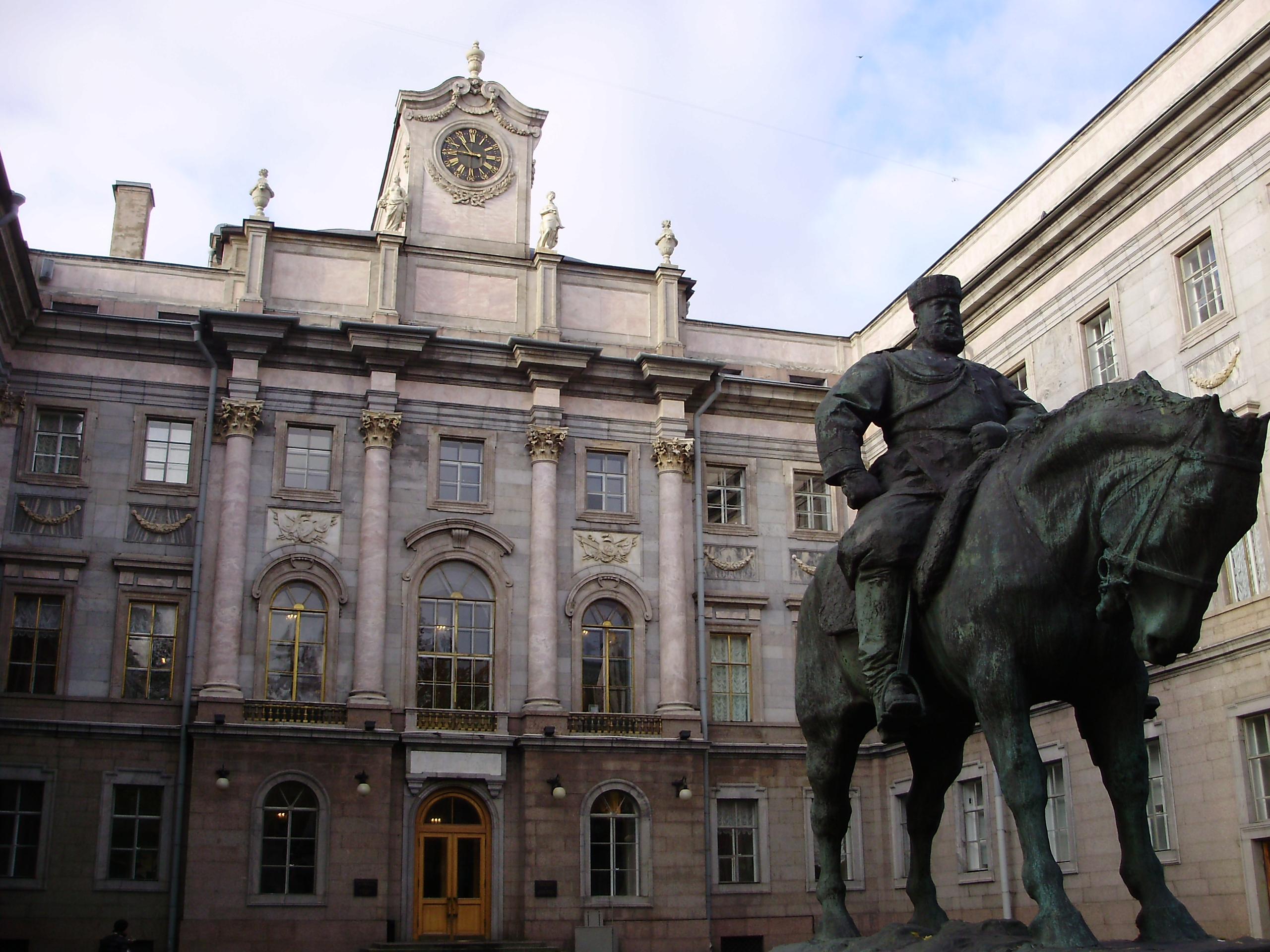
The equestrian statue of Alexander III, by Prince Paolo Troubetzkoy, shows the Emperor sitting heavily on the back of a ponderous horse

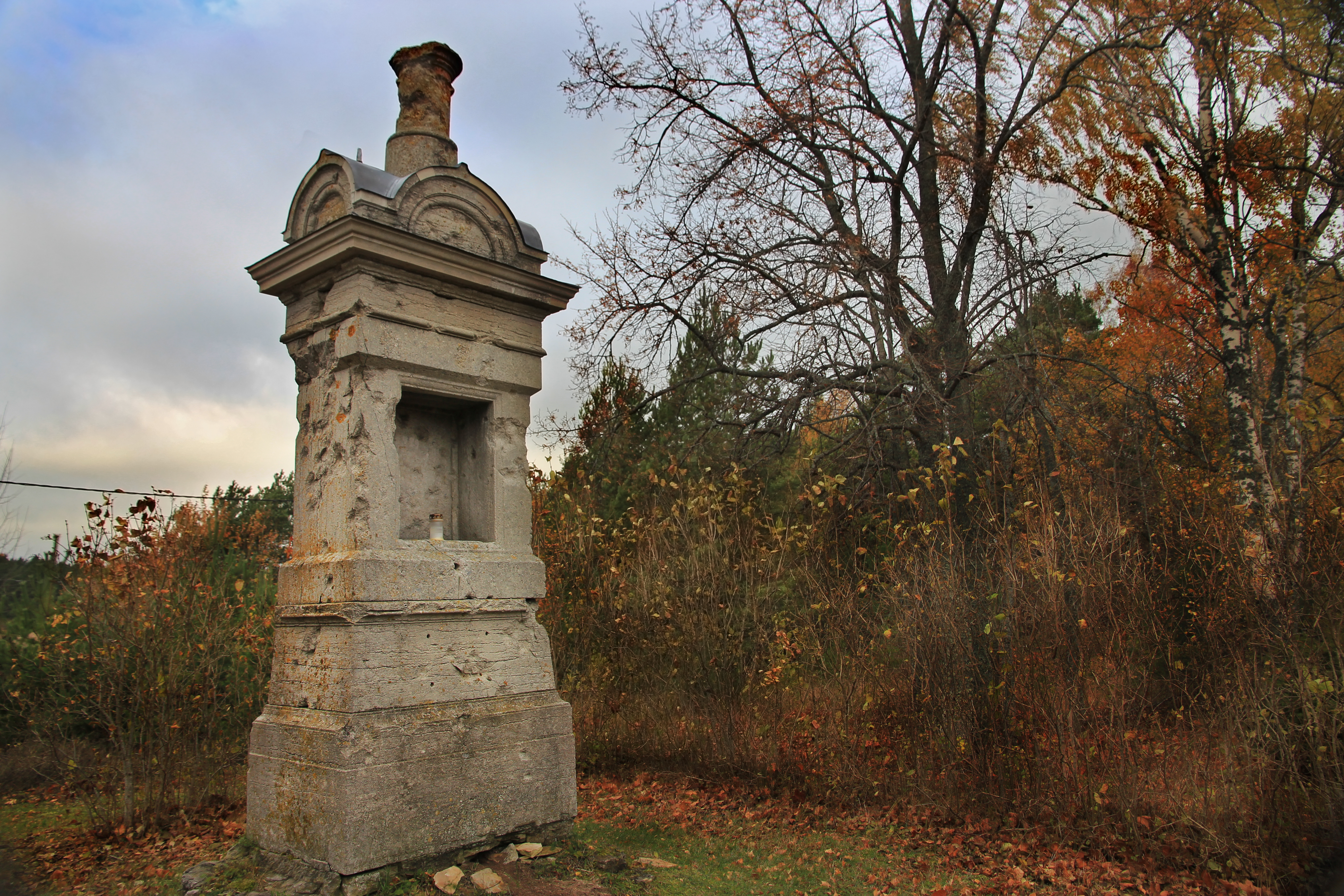
Memorial dedicated to Alexander III in Pullapää, Estonia

In 1909, a bronze equestrian statue of Alexander III sculpted by Paolo Troubetzkoy was placed in Znamenskaya Square in front of the Moscow Rail Terminal in St. Petersburg. Both the horse and rider were sculpted in massive form, leading to the nickname of "hippopotamus". Troubetzkoy envisioned the statue as a caricature, jesting that he wished "to portray an animal atop another animal", and it was quite controversial at the time, with many, including the members of the Imperial Family, opposed to the design, but it was approved because the Empress Dowager unexpectedly liked the monument. Following the Revolution of 1917, the statue remained in place as a symbol of tsarist autocracy until 1937 when it was placed in storage. In 1994, it was again put on public display, although in a different place – in front of the Marble Palace. Another pre-revolutionary memorial is located in the city of Irkutsk at the Angara embankment.

For Alexander's role in forging the Franco-Russian Alliance, the French Republic commissioned a bridge named in his honour, Pont Alexandre III. It was opened by his son, Nicholas II, and exists to this day.

On 18 November 2017, Vladimir Putin unveiled a bronze monument to Alexander III on the site of the former Maly Livadia Palace in Crimea. The four-meter monument by Russian sculptor Andrey Kovalchuk depicts Alexander III sitting on a stump, his stretched arms resting on a sabre. An inscription says "Russia has only two allies: the Army and the Navy", although historians dispute whether the Tsar actually said those words. Alexander III is believed to be one of Putin's admired historic leaders, along with Joseph Stalin. On 5 June 2021, he unveiled another monument to Alexander on the site of Gatchina Palace.

There remains a memorial plaque dedicated to Alexander III in Zaczerlany, Poland.

== Honours ==
Domestic

- Knight of St. Andrew, 10 March 1845
- Knight of St. Alexander Nevsky, 10 March 1845
- Knight of St. Anna, 1st Class, 10 March 1845
- Knight of the White Eagle, 10 March 1845
- Knight of St. Vladimir, 4th Class, 1864; 3rd Class, 1870
- Knight of St. Stanislaus, 1st Class, 1865
- Knight of St. George, 2nd Class, 1877

Foreign

- Austrian Empire: Grand Cross of the Royal Hungarian Order of St. Stephen, 1866
- Baden:
  - Knight of the House Order of Fidelity, 1872
  - Grand Cross of the Zähringer Lion, 1872
- Kingdom of Bavaria: Knight of St. Hubert, 1865
- Belgium: Grand Cordon of the Order of Leopold (military), 7 June 1865
- Empire of Brazil:
  - Knight Grand Cross of the Southern Cross, 14 January 1866
  - Knight Grand Cross of the Order of Pedro I, 15 September 1868
- Principality of Bulgaria: Order of Bravery, 1st Class
- Denmark:
  - Knight of the Elephant, 29 June 1865
  - Cross of Honour of the Order of the Dannebrog, 3 July 1866
  - Grand Commander of the Dannebrog, 9 November 1891
  - Commemorative Medal for the Golden Wedding of King Christian IX and Queen Louise, 1892
- (Saxe-Coburg and Gotha) (Duchy of Saxe-Altenburg) (Saxe-Meiningen) Ernestine duchies: Grand Cross of the Saxe-Ernestine House Order, 1884
- France: Grand Cross of the Legion of Honour, 9 June 1878
- Kingdom of Greece: Knight Grand Cross of the Redeemer, 15 July 1866
- Kingdom of Hawaii: Knight Grand Cross of the Order of Kamehameha I, 1881
- Kingdom of Hanover:
  - Knight of St. George, 1865
  - Grand Cross of the Royal Guelphic Order, 1865
- Grand Duchy of Hesse: Grand Cross of the Ludwig Order, 8 June 1857
- Kingdom of Italy: Knight of the Annunciation, 5 July 1865
- Sovereign Military Order of Malta: Bailiff Knight Grand Cross of Honour and Devotion of the Order of Saint John of Jerusalem, 12 January 1876
- Empire of Japan:
  - Grand Cordon of the Rising Sun, 28 August 1879
  - Grand Cordon of the Order of the Chrysanthemum, 20 May 1880
- Mecklenburg:
  - Grand Cross of the Wendish Crown, with Crown in Ore, 4 July 1865
  - Cross for Distinction in War (Strelitz), 3 December 1877
- Mexican Empire: Grand Cross of the Mexican Eagle, with Collar, 10 April 1866
- Monaco: Grand Cross of St. Charles, 14 August 1883
- Principality of Montenegro: Grand Cross of the Order of Prince Danilo I, 4 January 1867
- Netherlands:
  - Knight Grand Cross of the Netherlands Lion, 19 May 1865
  - Knight Grand Cross of the Military William Order, 17 March 1881
- Oldenburg: Grand Cross of the Order of Duke Peter Friedrich Ludwig, with Golden Crown, 28 July 1860
- Ottoman Empire:
  - Order of Osmanieh, 1st Class, 1 April 1866
  - Order of Distinction, 3 December 1884
- Kingdom of Portugal:
  - Grand Cross of the Tower and Sword, 22 June 1865
  - Grand Cross of the Sash of the Two Orders, 1 May 1873; Three Orders, 25 May 1881
- Persian Empire: Order of the August Portrait, 15 December 1869
- Kingdom of Prussia:
  - Knight of the Black Eagle, 10 March 1855; with Collar, 1868
  - Grand Commander's Cross of the Royal House Order of Hohenzollern, 25 September 1872
  - Pour le Mérite (military), 27 December 1877
- Kingdom of Romania:
  - Grand Cross of the Star of Romania, 15 November 1877
  - Military Virtue Medal, 17 January 1878
  - Crossing of the Danube Cross (military), 10 May 1879
- Kingdom of Saxony: Knight of the Rue Crown, 1866
- Saxe-Weimar-Eisenach: Grand Cross of the White Falcon, 3 October 1864
- Principality of Serbia:
  - Grand Cross of the Cross of Takovo, 26 March 1878
  - Bronze Commemorative Medal for the Russo-Turkish War, 17 April 1878
  - Grand Cross of the White Eagle, 29 April 1883
- Siam: Knight of the Order of the Royal House of Chakri, 15 July 1891
- Spain: Knight of the Golden Fleece, 6 September 1865
- Sweden-Norway:
  - Knight of the Seraphim, 2 June 1865
  - Grand Cross of St. Olav, 25 August 1879
- United Kingdom: Stranger Knight Companion of the Garter, 2 April 1881
- Württemberg: Grand Cross of the Württemberg Crown, 1864

=== Arms ===
Lesser Coat of Arms of the Russian Empire

== Issue ==
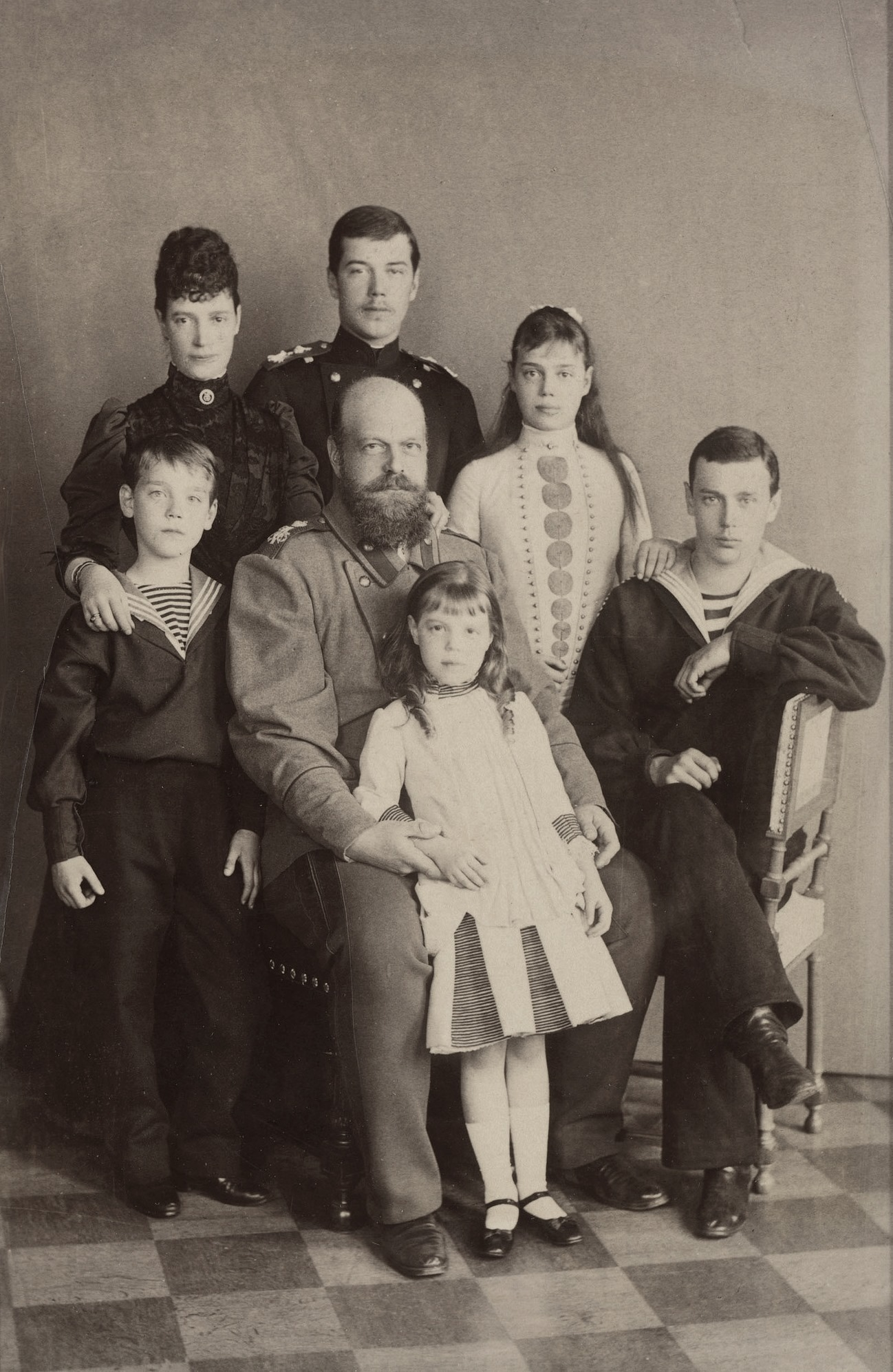
Alexander III with his wife and their children

Alexander III had six children (five of whom survived to adulthood) of his marriage with Princess Dagmar of Denmark, also known as Marie Feodorovna.

(Note: all dates prior to 1918 are in the Old Style Calendar)

Name	Birth	Death	Notes
Nicholas II of Russia	18 May 1868	17 July 1918	married 26 November 1894, Princess Alix of Hesse (1872–1918); had five children, murdered at the hands of the Bolsheviks along with his wife and children.
Grand Duke Alexander Alexandrovich of Russia	7 June 1869	2 May 1870	died of meningitis, aged 10 months and 26 days
Grand Duke George Alexandrovich of Russia	9 May 1871	10 July 1899	died of tuberculosis, aged 28; had no issue
Grand Duchess Xenia Alexandrovna of Russia	6 April 1875	20 April 1960	married 6 August 1894, Grand Duke Alexander Mikhailovich of Russia (1866–1933); had seven children
Grand Duke Michael Alexandrovich of Russia	4 December 1878	13 June 1918	married 16 October 1912, Natalia Sergeyevna Wulfert (1880–1952); had one child
Grand Duchess Olga Alexandrovna of Russia	13 June 1882	24 November 1960	married 9 August 1901, Duke Peter Alexandrovich of Oldenburg (1868–1924); div. 16 October 1916; had no issue. married 16 November 1916, Colonel Nikolai Kulikovsky (1881–1958); had two children

== See also ==
- Russian America
- Tsars of Russia family tree
- List of Russian monarchs
- Emperor of all the Russias
- President of the Soviet Union

== Bibliography ==
- Dorpalen, Andreas. "Tsar Alexander III and the Boulanger Crisis in France." Journal of Modern History 23.2 (1951): 122–136. online
- Etty, John. "Alexander III, Tsar of Russia 1881–1889." History Review 60 (2008): 1–5. online
- Hutchinson, John F. Late Imperial Russia: 1890–1917 (Routledge, 1999).
- Lincoln, W. Bruce. The Romanovs : autocrats of all the Russias (1981) online free to borrow
- Lowe, Charles. Alexander III of Russia (1895) online free full-length old biography
- Nelipa, M., Alexander III His Life and Reign (2014), Gilbert's Books
- Polunov, A. Iu. "Konstantin Petrovich Pobedonostsev – Man and Politician". Russian Studies in History 39.4 (2001): 8–32. online, by a leading scholar
- Polunov, A. Iu. "The Orthodox Church in the Baltic Region and the Policies of Alexander Ill's Government." Russian Studies in History 39.4 (2001): 66–76. online
- Suny, Ronald Grigor. "Rehabilitating Tsarism: The Imperial Russian State and Its Historians. A Review Article" Comparative Studies in Society and History 31#1 (1989) pp. 168–179 online
- Thomson, Oliver. Romanovs: Europe's Most Obsessive Dynasty (2008) ch 13
- Whelan, Heide W. Alexander III & the State Council: bureaucracy & counter-reform in late imperial Russia (Rutgers UP, 1982).

Alexander III of Russia House of Holstein-Gottorp-Romanov Cadet branch of the House of Oldenburg Born: 13 March 1845 Died: 1 November 1894
Regnal titles
Preceded by Alexander II	Emperor of Russia; Grand Duke of Finland; King of Poland; 13 March 1881–1 November 1894	Succeeded by Nicholas II
