= Birky =

Birky or Borki may refer to the following:

Locations in Ukraine

- Birky, Kharkiv Raion, Kharkiv Oblast, urban-type settlement
- Birky, Chuhuiv Raion, Kharkiv Oblast, village
- Birky, Yavoriv Raion, Lviv Oblast, village in Lviv Oblast

Games

- Birky (card game), a Scottish card game
