= Cathedral of Christ the Saviour, Borki =

Coordinates: 49°41′15″N 36°07′37″E

Cathedral of Christ the Saviour
- Храм Христа Спасителя
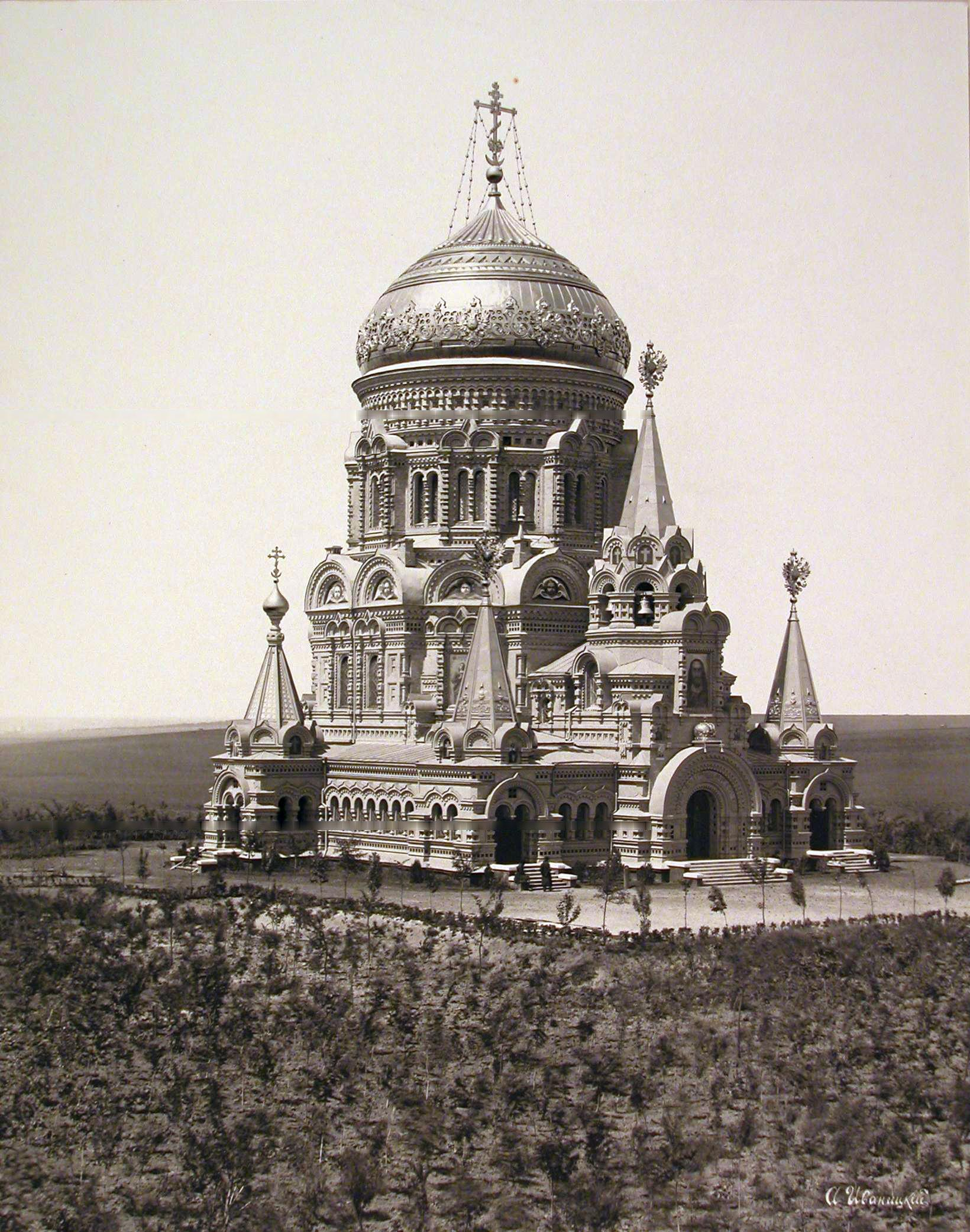
- The Cathedral in 1894
- Cathedral of Christ the Saviour
- Location: Borki, Kharkov Governorate
- Country: Ukraine
- Denomination: Russian Orthodox

History
- Dedication: Our Savior Not Made by Hands
- Consecrated: 20 August 1894

Architecture
- Functional status: Partially demolished
- Architect: Robert Marfeld
- Years built: 1891–1894
- Demolished: 1943

The Cathedral of Christ the Savior (Ukrainian: Храм Христа Спасителя) was a Russian Orthodox Cathedral near the village of Borki (now Birky, Ukraine) which was built to commemorate the survival of the Russian Imperial family in the 1888 Borki train disaster. It was built between 1891 and 1894, and destroyed in the Second World War.

== History ==
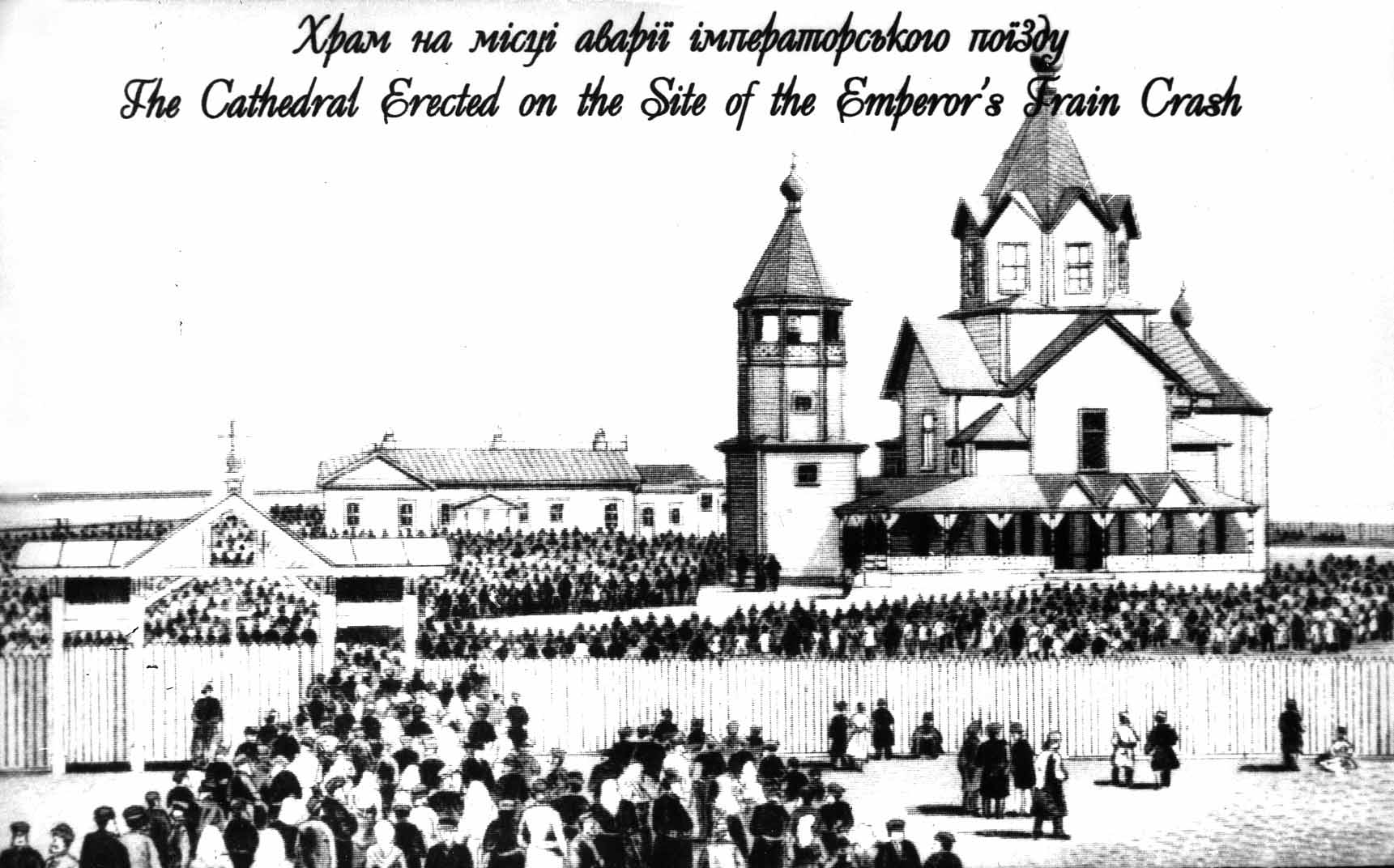
The first church at the site, with pilgrims

=== Origins ===
Although 21 people died in the Borki train disaster, when the Russian imperial train derailed en route from Crimea to Saint Petersburg, the Russian Imperial Family, including Tsar Alexander III, escaped the accident unharmed. The survival of the Imperial family was widely taken to be a miracle, and Alexander publicly attributed his survival to divine intercession and "to the fervent prayers, which thousands and thousands of sons of Russia daily make for Us". Orthodox churches across the empire commemorated the event with miracle icons, votive chapels, and churches, and the disaster catalyzed an even-closer alignment of the state church with the Tsar.

Accordingly, Alexander called for the construction of a church at the site of the accident, similar in purpose to other churches dedicated to events in the Imperial family's life, such as the Church of the Savior on Spilled Blood in Saint Petersburg. A local official dedicated the land adjacent to the crash site, which was unsettled forest land but quickly became a target of devotion and pilgrimage as the faithful sought to make prayers of thanksgiving for the Tsar's survival. Local clerics sponsored the construction of a humble wooden church and skete at the site, which was consecrated on August 20, 1889. The church housed an icon of the Savior Not Made by Hands, which was closely tied to the Imperial family and the Borki disaster as the Romanov Savior.

=== Cathedral ===
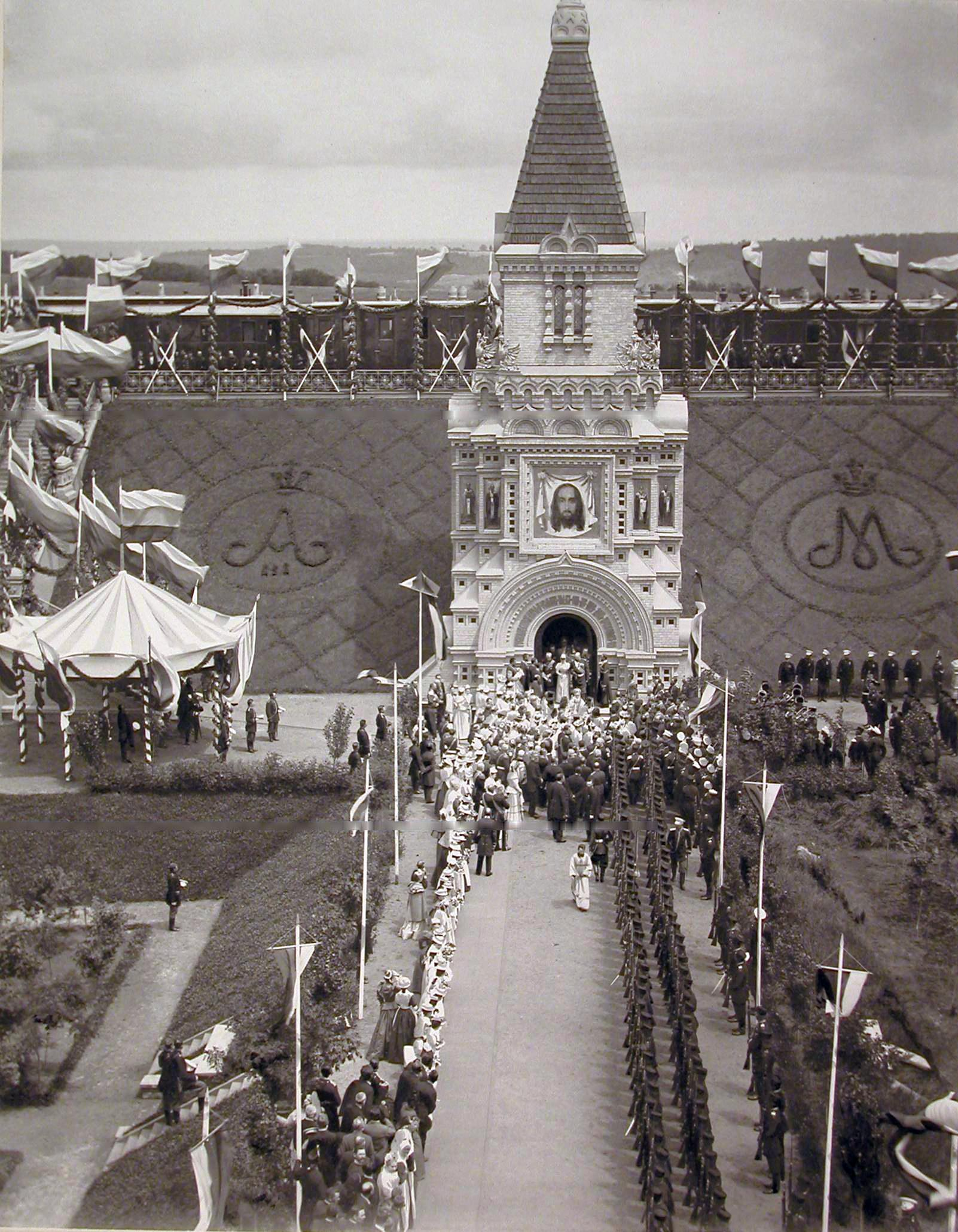
The consecration of the now-restored chapel in the presence of the Tsar and Tsarina, with the elaborate railway platform

Local businessmen raised money for a more permanent and grand structure, and the cornerstone for the new cathedral was laid on May 21, 1891 in the presence of Empress Maria Feodorovna and other members of the Imperial family. The first structure to be built was the bell tower chapel, which was placed at the spot where the Imperial family had emerged from the derailed train. The tracks remained in place, and the Imperial Railway Ministry paid for an extravagant embankment which connected the tracks to the new complex. The main cathedral was completed in 1894, and its golden dome was visible from miles away. The building was dedicated on July 14, 1894 in the presence of Alexander and the rest of the Imperial family. A few months later, Alexander died at Livadia, and his coffin was brought to the cathedral for a panakhida en route to Saint Petersburg.

In 1900, the site came under the jurisdiction of the Railway Ministry, which paid for the construction of a hospital, school, museum, and library at the site. The pious Nicholas II, who felt devoted to the accident, visited the Cathedral during the First World War, on April 19, 1915.

After the Russian Revolution and the victory of the Bolsheviks, Borki was renamed Shemetiv and the Cathedral was deconsecrated and stripped of its icons and ornament. It initially served as a pesticide warehouse, and later as a children's home or school. In the 1930s, Borki was renamed to Pervomayskoye.

The Cathedral burned during the early stages of the Second World War, and its dome collapsed. The rest of the Cathedral was destroyed in 1943, as the German army was pushed out of the area by the Soviet army. The bell tower chapel was burned, but the structure survived as a warehouse; it was restored in 1993 with local donations and support from Southern Railways.

== Architecture ==
The Cathedral, designed by Russian-German architect Robert Marfeld (also designer of the Alexander Nevsky Cathedral in Baku, among other buildings) was a "fanciful" single-domed Russian revival building, richly decorated with kokoshniki and other types of ornament. Its done and much of its ornament was gilded with gold leaf. The dome was surrounded by a gallery. The building could hold 1,400 parishioners.

Although the Cathedral only stood for 49 years, its design was widely admired. The designs of the Church of the Epiphany in St. Petersburg (completed 1899) and the Cathedral of St. Sophia in Harbin (completed 1907) were closely based on the design of the Cathedral at Borki.
