= Borki, Republic of Buryatia =

Borki Борки
- Settlement
- Location within Republic of Buryatia Location within Russia
- Coordinates: 52°09′N 106°28′E
- Country: Russia
- Region: Republic of Buryatia
- District: Kabansky District
- Time zone: UTC+8:00

Borki (Russian: Борки) is a rural locality (a settlement) in Kabansky District, Republic of Buryatia, Russia. The population was 184 as of 2010. There are 2 streets.

== Geography ==
Borki is located 20 km (12 mi) northwest of Kabansk (the district's administrative centre) by road. Tvorogovo is the nearest rural locality.
