= Birky, Chuhuiv Raion, Kharkiv Oblast =

Birky Бірки
- Village
- Location of Birky Birky (Ukraine)
- Coordinates: 49°43′05″N 36°03′19″E
- Country: Ukraine
- Oblast: Kharkiv Oblast
- Raion: Chuhuiv Raion
- Hromada: Zmiiv urban hromada
- Founded: 1659

Area
  - Total: 1.31 km^{2} (0.51 sq mi)

Population (2001)
  - Total: 2,936
  - Density: 2,241.22/km^{2} (5,804.7/sq mi)

Birky (Ukrainian: Бірки; Russian: Борки) is a village in Chuhuiv Raion of Kharkiv Oblast, Ukraine, with a population of 2936 in 2001. Birky belongs to Zmiiv urban hromada, one of the hromadas of Ukraine.

== History ==
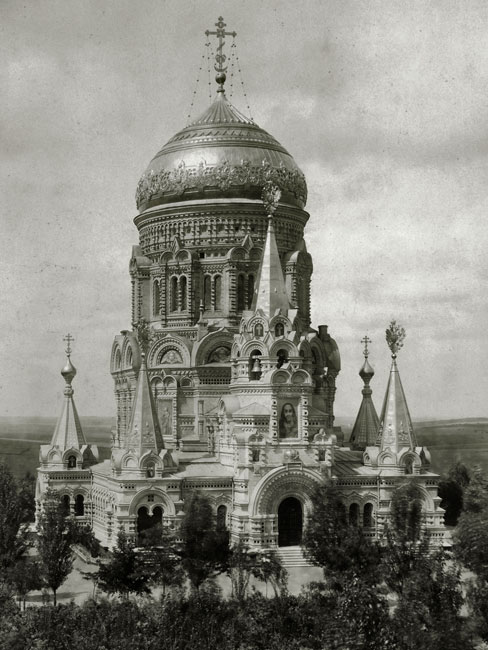
The Cathedral of Christ the Savior in Birky was destroyed during the Second World War.

1321 persons were recorded in 1864. Railway opened in 1869. This was the site of the Borki train disaster in 1888, which nearly killed Emperor Alexander III of Russia. 2791 residents were living here in 1914.

Until 18 July 2020, Birky belonged to Zmiiv Raion. The raion was abolished in July 2020 as part of the administrative reform of Ukraine, which reduced the number of raions of Kharkiv Oblast to seven. The area of Zmiiv Raion was merged into Chuhuiv Raion.
