= Church of the Epiphany (Saint Petersburg) =

Church of the Epiphany, St.Petersburg
- Церковь Богоявления Господня, Санкт-Петербург (Russian)
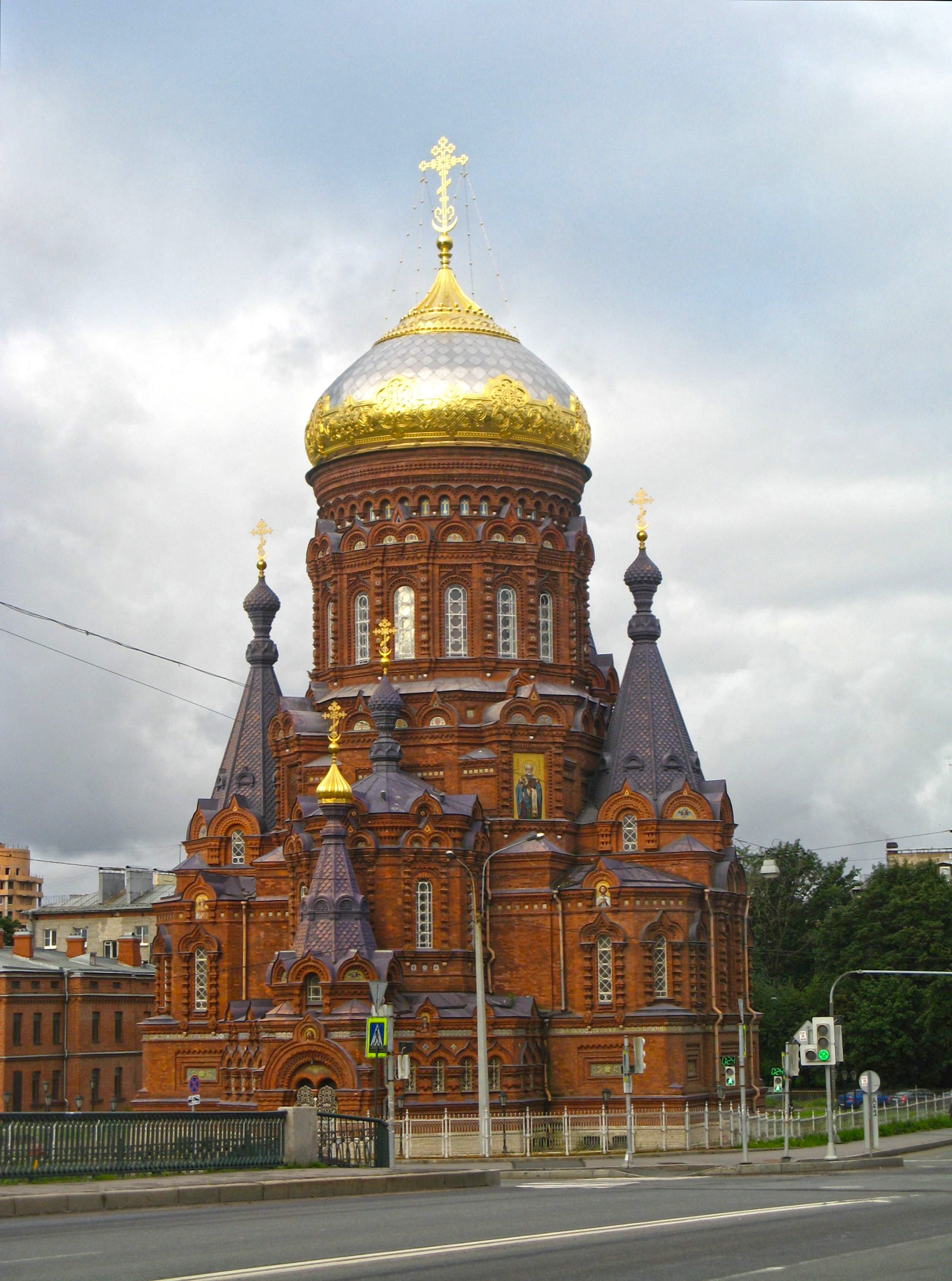
- Church of the Epiphany
- Interactive map of the Church of the Epiphany, St.Petersburg area

General information
- Type: Church
- Location: 2, Dvinskaya Ulitsa, Gutuevsky Island, Saint Petersburg, Russia
- Coordinates: 59.909°N 30.257°E
- Completed: 1899

Design and construction
- Architect: Vasily Kosyakov

The Church of the Epiphany is an Orthodox Church on Gutuevsky Island, Saint Petersburg.

The church commemorates the survival of Tsesarevich Nicholas Alexandrovich in the Ōtsu incident. It was designed by Vasily Kosyakov and built from 1892 to 1899. Its design was based on the Cathedral of Christ the Saviour in Borki.
