= Borki, Belgorod Oblast =

Borki Борки
- Selo
- Location within Belgorod Oblast Location within Russia
- Coordinates: 50°08′N 37°53′E
- Country: Russia
- Region: Belgorod Oblast
- District: Valuysky District
- Time zone: UTC+3:00

Borki (Russian: Борки) is a rural locality (a selo) and the administrative center of Borchanskoye Rural Settlement, Valuysky District, Belgorod Oblast, Russia. The population was 655 as of 2010. There are 5 streets.

== Geography ==
Borki is located 25 km southwest of Valuyki (the district's administrative centre) by road. Babki is the nearest rural locality.
