= Polom =

Polom may refer to places:

== Bosnia and Herzegovina ==
- Polom (Bratunac), a village in Bratunac, Bosnia and Herzegovina

== Czech Republic ==
- Polom (Přerov District), a municipality and village in the Olomouc Region
- Polom (Rychnov nad Kněžnou District), a municipality and village in the Hradec Králové Region
- Polom, a village and part of Bochov in the Karlovy Vary Region
- Polom, a village and part of Sedloňov in the Hradec Králové Region
- Polom, a village and part of Sulkovec in the Vysočina Region
- Polom, a village and part of Trhová Kamenice in the Pardubice Region

== Poland ==
- Połom, Olecko County, a village in the administrative district of Gmina Świętajno
- Połom, Szczytno County, a village in the administrative district of Gmina Świętajno

== Serbia ==
- Polom (Gornji Milanovac), a village in the municipality of Gornji Milanovac
- Polom (Vladičin Han), a village in the municipality of Vladičin Han

== Slovenia ==
- Polom, Kočevje, a settlement in the Municipality of Kočevje
