= Cichy =

Cichy (meaning "silent" in Polish) may refer to:

== People ==
- Cichy (surname)

== Places ==
- Cichy, Lublin Voivodeship, a village in the administrative district of Gmina Tarnogród
- Cichy, Warmian-Masurian Voivodeship (Czychen), a village in the administrative district of Gmina Świętajno

== See also ==
- Tichý, Czech and Slovak form of the same word
