= Barany =

Barany may refer to the following places:

- Barany, Kuyavian-Pomeranian Voivodeship (north-central Poland)
- Barany, Łódź Voivodeship (central Poland)
- Barany, Ełk County in Warmian-Masurian Voivodeship (north Poland)
- Barany, Olecko County in Warmian-Masurian Voivodeship (north Poland)

== See also ==
- Bárány (disambiguation)
