= Tichy (disambiguation) =

Tichy may refer to:

- Tichy, a town in Algeria
- Tichy District, a district in Algeria
- Tichý (surname)
- Tichy (surname)
