= Chełchy =

Chełchy may refer to the following places:

- Chełchy, Masovian Voivodeship (east-central Poland)
- Chełchy, Podlaskie Voivodeship (north-east Poland)
- Chełchy, Ełk County in Warmian-Masurian Voivodeship (north Poland)
- Chełchy, Gmina Kowale Oleckie in Warmian-Masurian Voivodeship (north Poland)
- Chełchy, Gmina Świętajno in Warmian-Masurian Voivodeship (north Poland)
