= Łężce =

Łężce may refer to the following places in Poland:

- Łężce, Lower Silesian Voivodeship (south-west Poland)
- Łężce, Łódź Voivodeship (central Poland)
- Łężce, Greater Poland Voivodeship (west-central Poland)
- Łężce, Opole Voivodeship (south-west Poland)
