= Gmina Świętajno =

Gmina Świętajno may refer to either of the following rural administrative districts in Warmian-Masurian Voivodeship in north-eastern Poland:

- Gmina Świętajno, Olecko County
- Gmina Świętajno, Szczytno County
