= Zawady Oleckie =

- Village
- Location within Poland
- Coordinates: 54°7′N 22°17′E
- Country: Poland
- Voivodeship: Warmian-Masurian
- County: Olecko
- Gmina: Kowale Oleckie

Zawady Oleckie [zaˈvadɨ ɔˈlɛt͡skʲɛ] (also Zawada; German: Sawadden, from 1938-45 Schwalgenort) is a village in the administrative district of Gmina Kowale Oleckie, within Olecko County, Warmian-Masurian Voivodeship, in northern Poland.

Zawady Oleckie is approximately 11 km (7 mi) south-west of Kowale Oleckie, 17 km (11 mi) north-west of Olecko, and 123 km (76 mi) east of the regional capital, Olsztyn.
