= Lipina =

Lipina may refer to places:

== Czech Republic ==
- Lipina (Olomouc District), a municipality and village

== Poland ==
- Lipina, Łódź Voivodeship, a village in central Poland
- Lipina, Lublin Voivodeship, a village in east Poland
- Lipina, Podlaskie Voivodeship, a village in northeast Poland
- Lipina, Warmian-Masurian Voivodeship, a village in north Poland
