= Makowiska =

Makowiska may refer to the following places:

- Makowiska, Bydgoszcz County in Kuyavian-Pomeranian Voivodeship (north-central Poland)
- Makowiska, Toruń County in Kuyavian-Pomeranian Voivodeship (north-central Poland)
- Makowiska, Lublin Voivodeship (east Poland)
- Makowiska, Łódź Voivodeship (central Poland)
- Makowiska, Subcarpathian Voivodeship (south-east Poland)
- Makowiska, West Pomeranian Voivodeship (north-west Poland)
