= Dudki, Olecko County =

Dudki
- Village
- Location within Poland
- Coordinates: 53°58′27″N 22°23′06″E
- Country: Poland
- Voivodeship: Warmian-Masurian
- County: Olecko
- Gmina: Świętajno

Dudki [ˈdutki] is a village in the administrative district of Gmina Świętajno, within Olecko County, Warmian-Masurian Voivodeship, in northern Poland.
