= Mazury, Warmian-Masurian Voivodeship =

Mazury
- Village
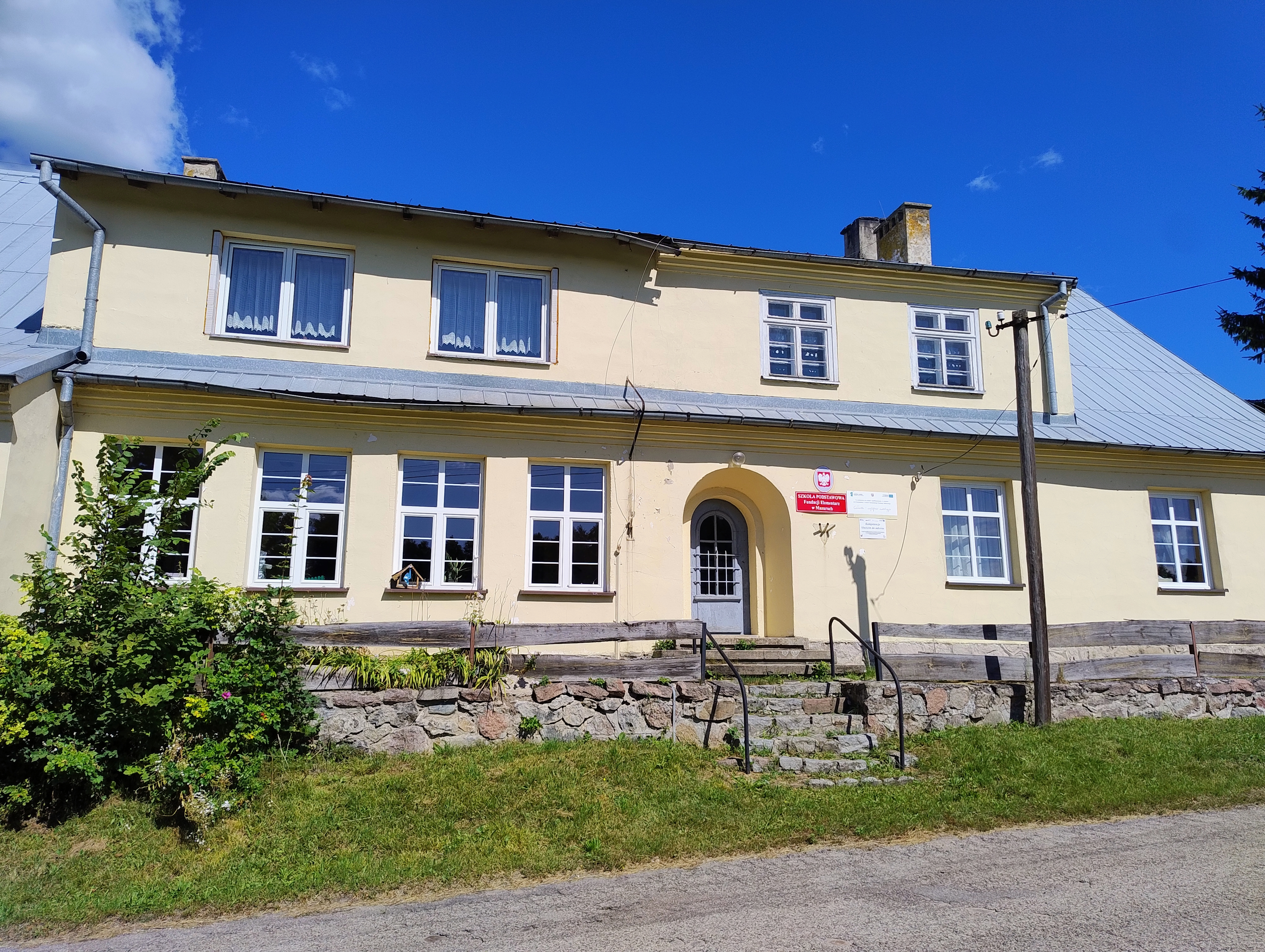

- Location within Poland
- Coordinates: 54°4′45″N 22°15′7″E
- Country: Poland
- Voivodeship: Warmian-Masurian
- County: Olecko
- Gmina: Świętajno

Mazury [maˈzurɨ] is a village in the administrative district of Gmina Świętajno, within Olecko County, Warmian-Masurian Voivodeship, in northern Poland.
