= Cicha Wólka =

- Village
- Location within Poland
- Coordinates: 54°06′15″N 22°17′20″E
- Country: Poland
- Voivodeship: Warmian-Masurian
- County: Olecko
- Gmina: Kowale Oleckie

Cicha Wólka [ˈt͡ɕixa ˈvulka] is a village in the administrative district of Gmina Kowale Oleckie, within Olecko County, Warmian-Masurian Voivodeship, in northern Poland.
