= Krzywe, Olecko County =

Krzywe
- Village
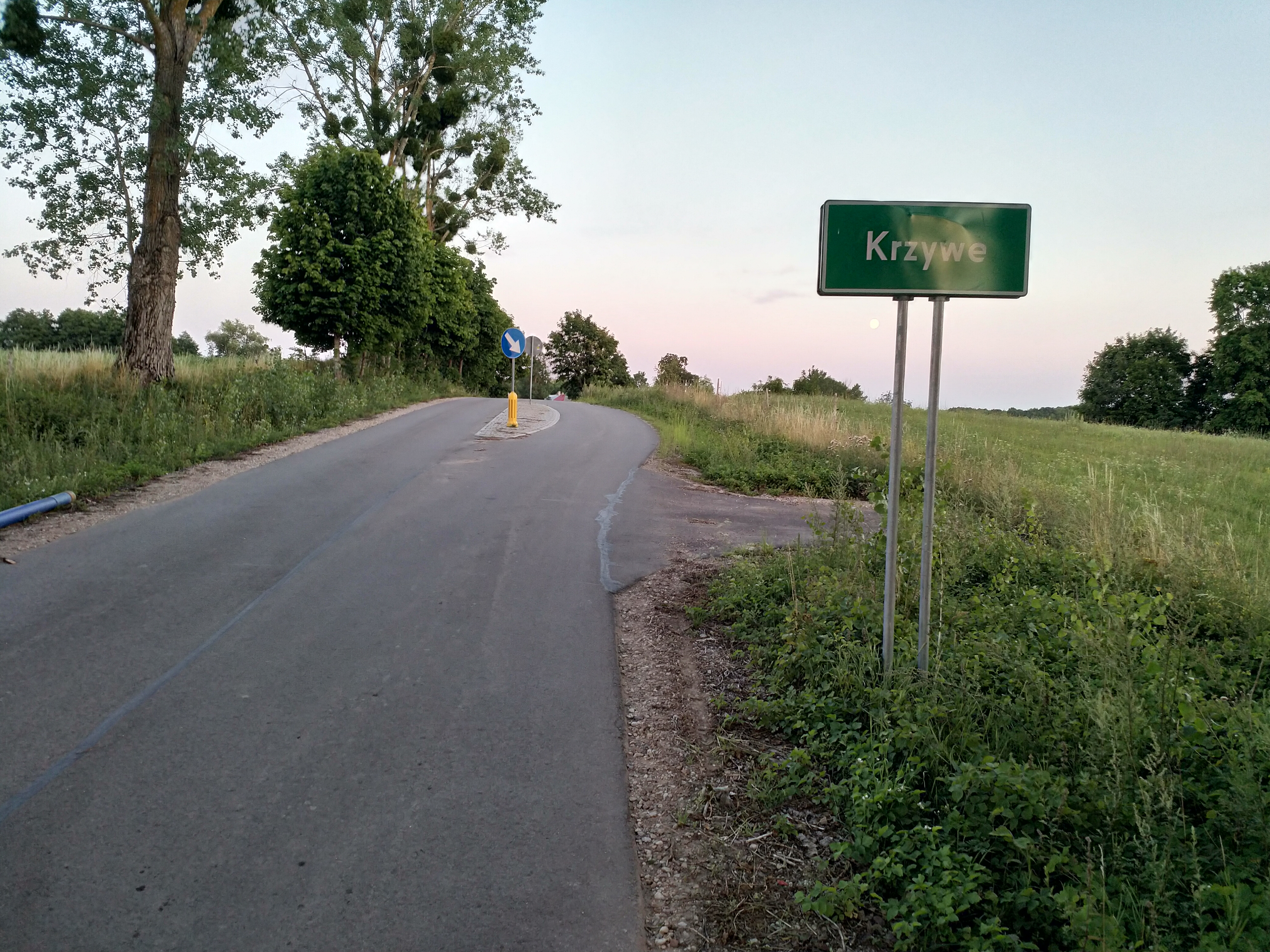

- Location within Poland
- Coordinates: 53°56′50″N 22°19′3″E
- Country: Poland
- Voivodeship: Warmian-Masurian
- County: Olecko
- Gmina: Świętajno

Krzywe [ˈkʂɨvɛ] is a village in the administrative district of Gmina Świętajno, within Olecko County, Warmian-Masurian Voivodeship, in northern Poland.
