= Dorsze, Olecko County =

Dorsze
- Village
- Location within Poland
- Coordinates: 54°11′46″N 22°23′26″E
- Country: Poland
- Voivodeship: Warmian-Masurian
- County: Olecko
- Gmina: Kowale Oleckie

Dorsze [ˈdɔrʂɛ] is a village in the administrative district of Gmina Kowale Oleckie, within Olecko County, Warmian-Masurian Voivodeship, in northern Poland.
