= Dylów Rządowy =

- Village
- Location within Poland
- Coordinates: 51°08′34″N 18°57′26″E
- Country: Poland
- Voivodeship: Łódź
- County: Pajęczno
- Gmina: Pajęczno

Dylów Rządowy [ˈdɨluf ʐɔnˈdɔvɨ] is a village in the administrative district of Gmina Pajęczno, within Pajęczno County, Łódź Voivodeship, in central Poland.
