= Podmurowaniec =

- Village
- Location within Poland
- Coordinates: 51°7′N 19°3′E
- Country: Poland
- Voivodeship: Łódź
- County: Pajęczno
- Gmina: Pajęczno

Podmurowaniec [pɔdmurɔˈvaɲɛt͡s] is a village in the administrative district of Gmina Pajęczno, within Pajęczno County, Łódź Voivodeship, in central Poland.
