= Ticha =

Ticha may refer to:

== People ==
- Tichá, feminine form of the Czech surname Tichý
- Ticha Penicheiro (born 1974), Portuguese basketball player

== Other ==
- Tichá, village in Moravian-Silesian Region, Czech Republic
- Ticha Stadium, sports venue in Varna, Bulgaria
- Ticha Reservoir, reservoir in Varbitsa Municipality, Shumen Province, Bulgaria
- Ticha Peak, peak in Antarctica
- 5757 Tichá, main-belt asteroid
