= Jurkowo, Olecko County =

Jurkowo
- Village
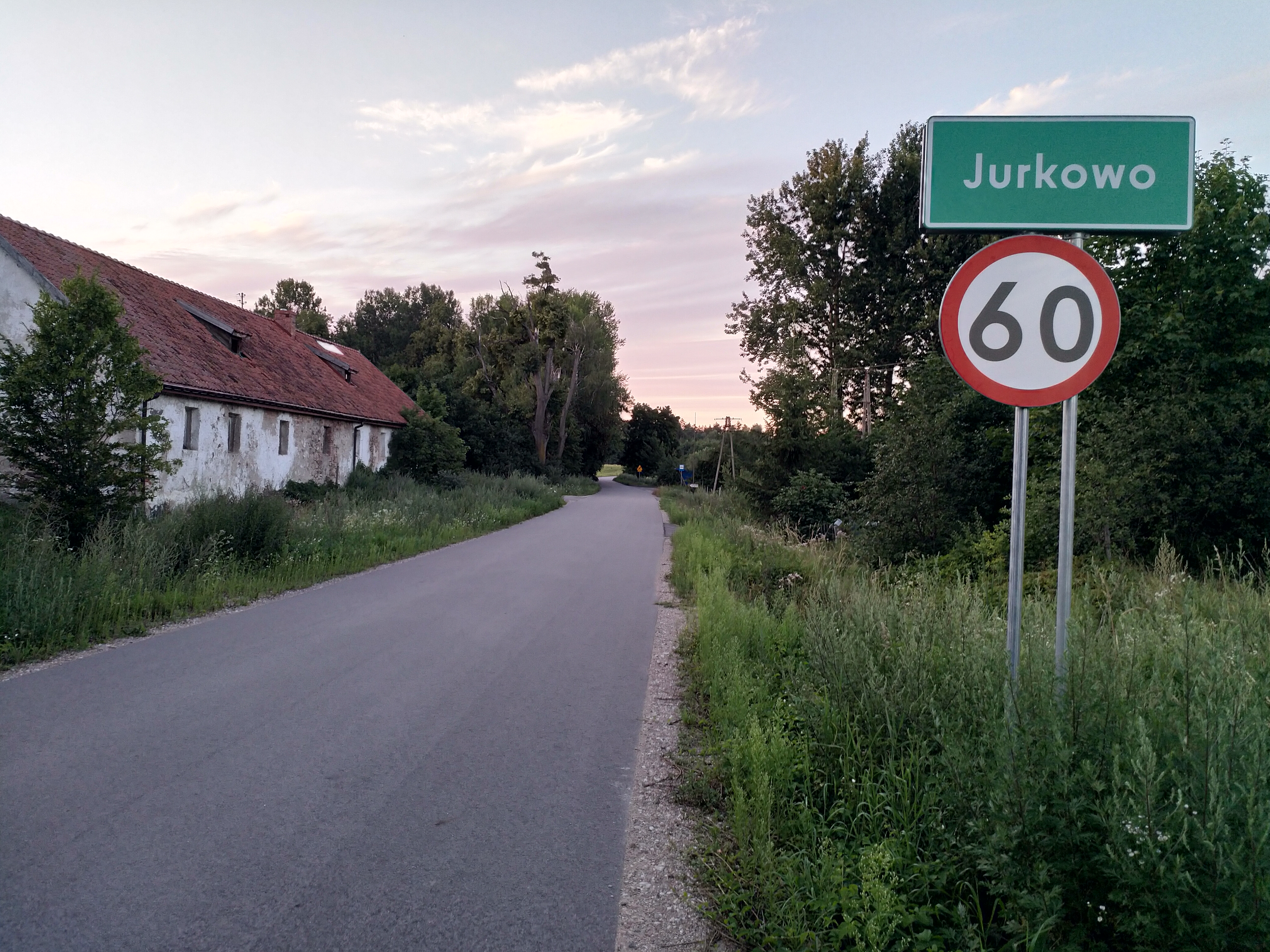

- Location within Poland
- Coordinates: 53°58′16″N 22°18′23″E
- Country: Poland
- Voivodeship: Warmian-Masurian
- County: Olecko
- Gmina: Świętajno

Jurkowo [jurˈkɔvɔ] is a village in the administrative district of Gmina Świętajno, within Olecko County, Warmian-Masurian Voivodeship, in northern Poland.
