= Wronki, Warmian-Masurian Voivodeship =

Wronki
- Village
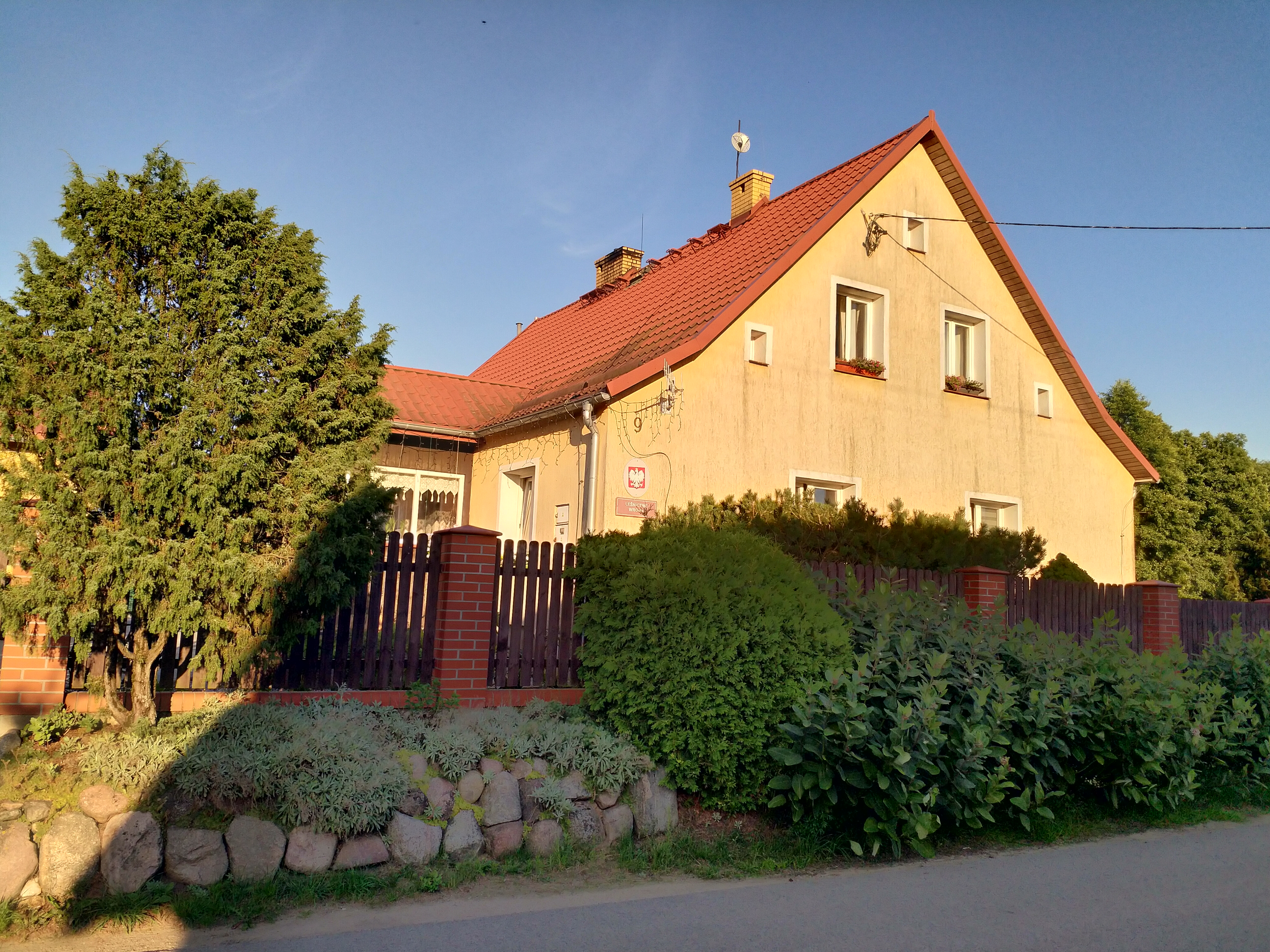

- Location within Poland
- Coordinates: 54°01′32″N 22°14′22″E
- Country: Poland
- Voivodeship: Warmian-Masurian
- County: Olecko
- Gmina: Świętajno
- Founded: 16th century
- Time zone: UTC+1 (CET)
  - Summer (DST): UTC+2 (CEST)
- Vehicle registration: NOE

Wronki [ˈvrɔnki] is a village in the administrative district of Gmina Świętajno, within Olecko County, Warmian-Masurian Voivodeship, in north-eastern Poland. It is located in the region of Masuria.

== History ==
Wronki was founded in the 16th century. As of 1600, the population of the village was solely Polish. In 1938, during a massive campaign of renaming of placenames, the government of Nazi Germany renamed it to Fronicken in attempt to erase traces of Polish origin. In 1939, it had a population of 342. Following Germany's defeat in World War II, in 1945, the village became again part of Poland and its historic name was restored.
