= Rogowszczyzna =

- Settlement
- Location within Poland
- Coordinates: 53°59′04″N 22°21′12″E
- Country: Poland
- Voivodeship: Warmian-Masurian
- County: Olecko
- Gmina: Świętajno

Rogowszczyzna [rɔɡɔfʂˈt͡ʂɨzna] is a settlement in the administrative district of Gmina Świętajno, within Olecko County, Warmian-Masurian Voivodeship, in northern Poland.
