= Wręczyca =

- Village
- Location within Poland
- Coordinates: 51°11′N 19°0′E
- Country: Poland
- Voivodeship: Łódź
- County: Pajęczno
- Gmina: Pajęczno

Wręczyca [vrɛnˈt͡ʂɨt͡sa] is a village in the administrative district of Gmina Pajęczno, within Pajęczno County, Łódź Voivodeship, in central Poland.
