= Golubie Wężewskie =

- Village
- Location within Poland
- Coordinates: 54°10′N 22°18′E
- Country: Poland
- Voivodeship: Warmian-Masurian
- County: Olecko
- Gmina: Kowale Oleckie

Golubie Wężewskie [ɡɔˈlubjɛ vɛ̃ˈʐɛfskʲɛ] is a village in the administrative district of Gmina Kowale Oleckie, within Olecko County, Warmian-Masurian Voivodeship in northern Poland.
