= Ładzin, Łódź Voivodeship =

Ładzin
- Village
- Location within Poland
- Coordinates: 51°7′0″N 19°4′49″E
- Country: Poland
- Voivodeship: Łódź
- County: Pajęczno
- Gmina: Pajęczno

Ładzin [ˈwad͡ʑin] is a village in the administrative district of Gmina Pajęczno, within Pajęczno County, Łódź Voivodeship, in central Poland.
