= Smolnik, Warmian-Masurian Voivodeship =

Smolnik
- Settlement
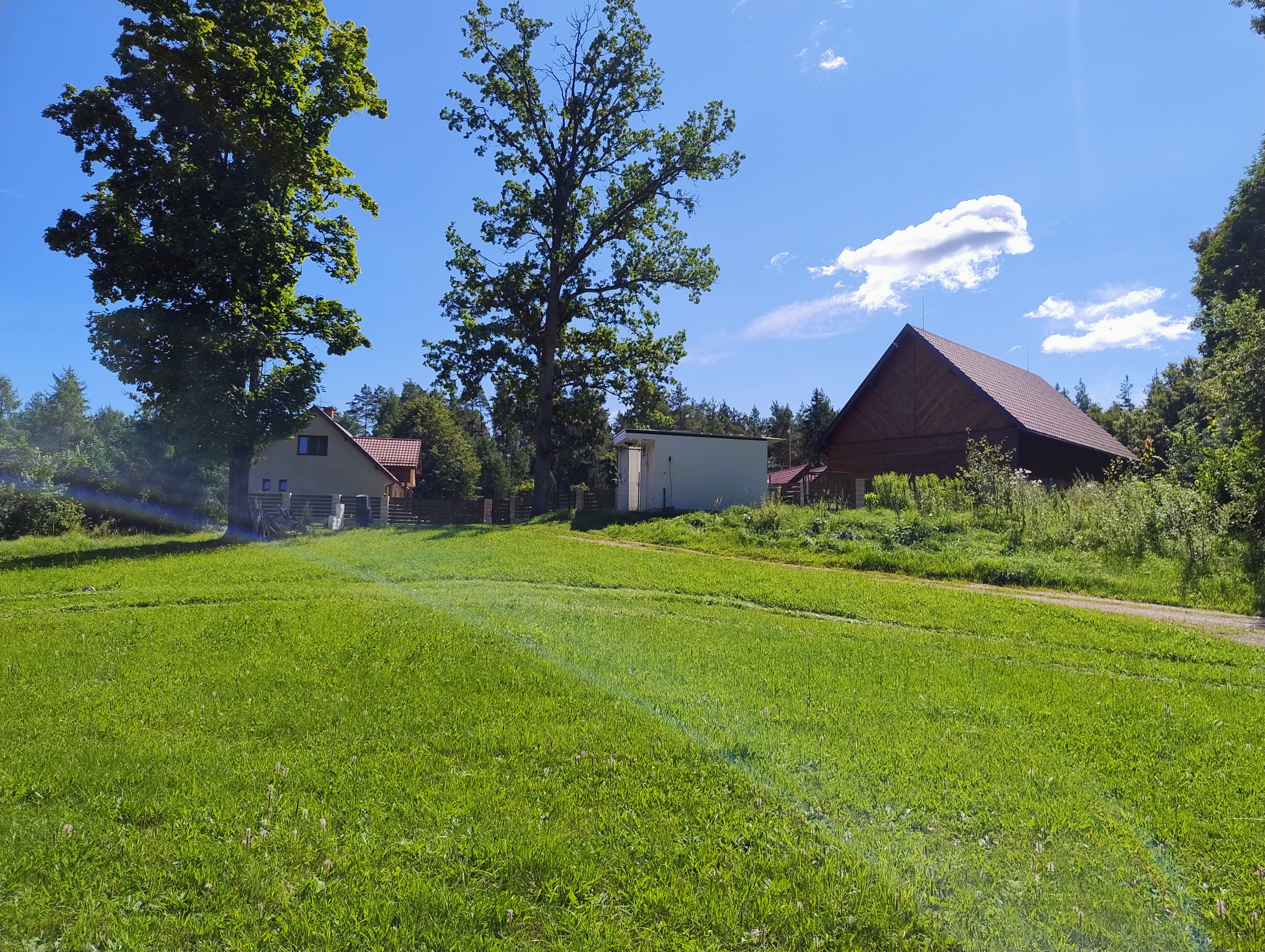

- Location within Poland
- Coordinates: 54°00′04″N 22°16′07″E
- Country: Poland
- Voivodeship: Warmian-Masurian
- County: Olecko
- Gmina: Świętajno

Smolnik [ˈsmɔlɲik] is a settlement in the administrative district of Gmina Świętajno, within Olecko County, Warmian-Masurian Voivodeship, in northern Poland.
