= Bárány =

Bárány is a Hungarian surname meaning "lamb". Notable people with the surname include:

- Árpád Bárány (born 1931), Hungarian fencer
- Imre Bárány (born 1947), Hungarian mathematician
- István Bárány (1907–1995), Hungarian swimmer
- Robert Bárány (1876–1936), Austrian-born otologist

== See also ==
- Bárány's caloric test
- Bárány chair
- Baranyi
