= Podładzin =

- Village
- Location within Poland
- Coordinates: 51°7′N 19°4′E
- Country: Poland
- Voivodeship: Łódź
- County: Pajęczno
- Gmina: Pajęczno

Podładzin [pɔdˈwad͡ʑin] is a village in the administrative district of Gmina Pajęczno, within Pajęczno County, Łódź Voivodeship, in central Poland.
