= Czerkiesy, Łódź Voivodeship =

Czerkiesy
- Village
- Location within Poland
- Coordinates: 51°6′29″N 19°0′48″E
- Country: Poland
- Voivodeship: Łódź
- County: Pajęczno
- Gmina: Pajęczno
- Population: 205

Czerkiesy [t͡ʂɛrˈkʲɛsɨ] is a village in the administrative district of Gmina Pajęczno, within Pajęczno County, Łódź Voivodeship, in central Poland.
