= Lakiele =

- Village
- Location within Poland
- Coordinates: 54°10′02″N 22°26′38″E
- Country: Poland
- Voivodeship: Warmian-Masurian
- County: Olecko
- Gmina: Kowale Oleckie

Lakiele [laˈkʲɛlɛ] is a village in the administrative district of Gmina Kowale Oleckie, within Olecko County, Warmian-Masurian Voivodeship, in northern Poland.
