= Niwiska Dolne =

- Village
- Location within Poland
- Coordinates: 51°6′N 18°58′E
- Country: Poland
- Voivodeship: Łódź
- County: Pajęczno
- Gmina: Pajęczno

Niwiska Dolne [niˈviska ˈdɔlnɛ] is a village in the administrative district of Gmina Pajęczno, within Pajęczno County, Łódź Voivodeship, in central Poland.
