= Rogojny =

- Village
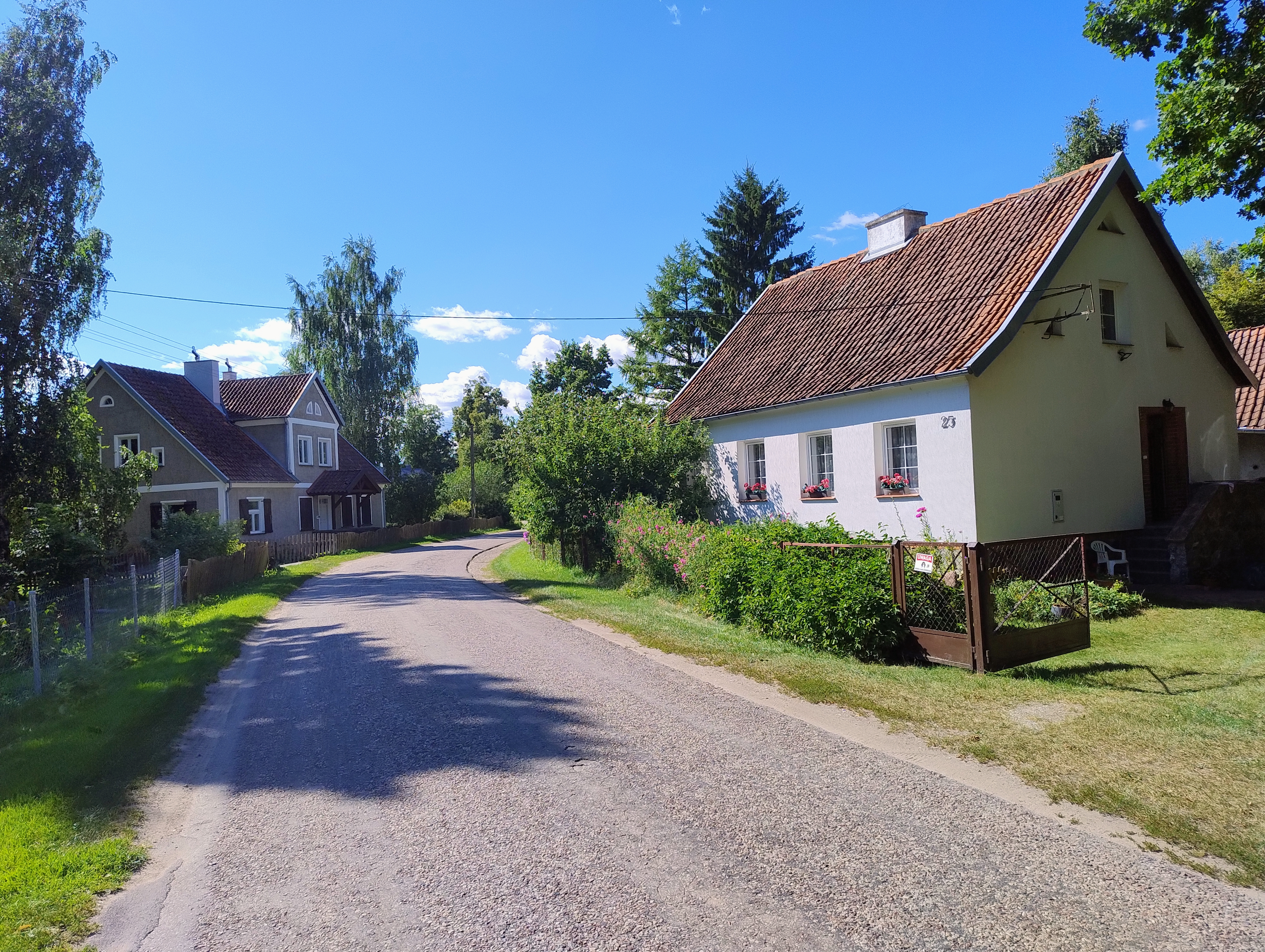

- Location within Poland
- Coordinates: 54°3′45″N 22°13′40″E
- Country: Poland
- Voivodeship: Warmian-Masurian
- County: Olecko
- Gmina: Świętajno

Rogojny [rɔˈɡɔi̯nɨ] is a village in the administrative district of Gmina Świętajno, within Olecko County, Warmian-Masurian Voivodeship, in northern Poland.

== Notable residents ==
- Bruno Walden (1911-1946), officer
