= Dylów Szlachecki =

- Village
- Location within Poland
- Coordinates: 51°9′N 18°58′E
- Country: Poland
- Voivodeship: Łódź
- County: Pajęczno
- Gmina: Pajęczno

Dylów Szlachecki (Polish pronunciation: [ˈdɨluf ʂlaˈxɛtskʲi]) is a village in the administrative district of Gmina Pajęczno, within Pajęczno County, Łódź Voivodeship, in central Poland.
