= Jurki, Olecko County =

Jurki
- Village
- Location within Poland
- Coordinates: 54°4′N 22°21′E
- Country: Poland
- Voivodeship: Warmian-Masurian
- County: Olecko
- Gmina: Świętajno
- Founded: 1560
- Founder: Jurek Kowalewski
- Named for: Jurek Kowalewski
- Time zone: UTC+1 (CET)
  - Summer (DST): UTC+2 (CEST)
- Postal code: 19-411
- Vehicle registration: NOE

Jurki [ˈjurki] is a village in the administrative district of Gmina Świętajno, within Olecko County, Warmian-Masurian Voivodeship, in north-eastern Poland.

== History ==
In 1560 Jurek Kowalewski bought land to establish a village. The village was named after the founder. As of 1600, the population was exclusively Polish.
