= Wężewo, Olecko County =

Wężewo
- Village
- Location within Poland
- Coordinates: 54°9′N 22°20′E
- Country: Poland
- Voivodeship: Warmian-Masurian
- County: Olecko
- Gmina: Kowale Oleckie

Wężewo [vɛ̃ˈʐɛvɔ] is a village in the administrative district of Gmina Kowale Oleckie, within Olecko County, Warmian-Masurian Voivodeship, in northern Poland.
