= Kukówko =

- Village
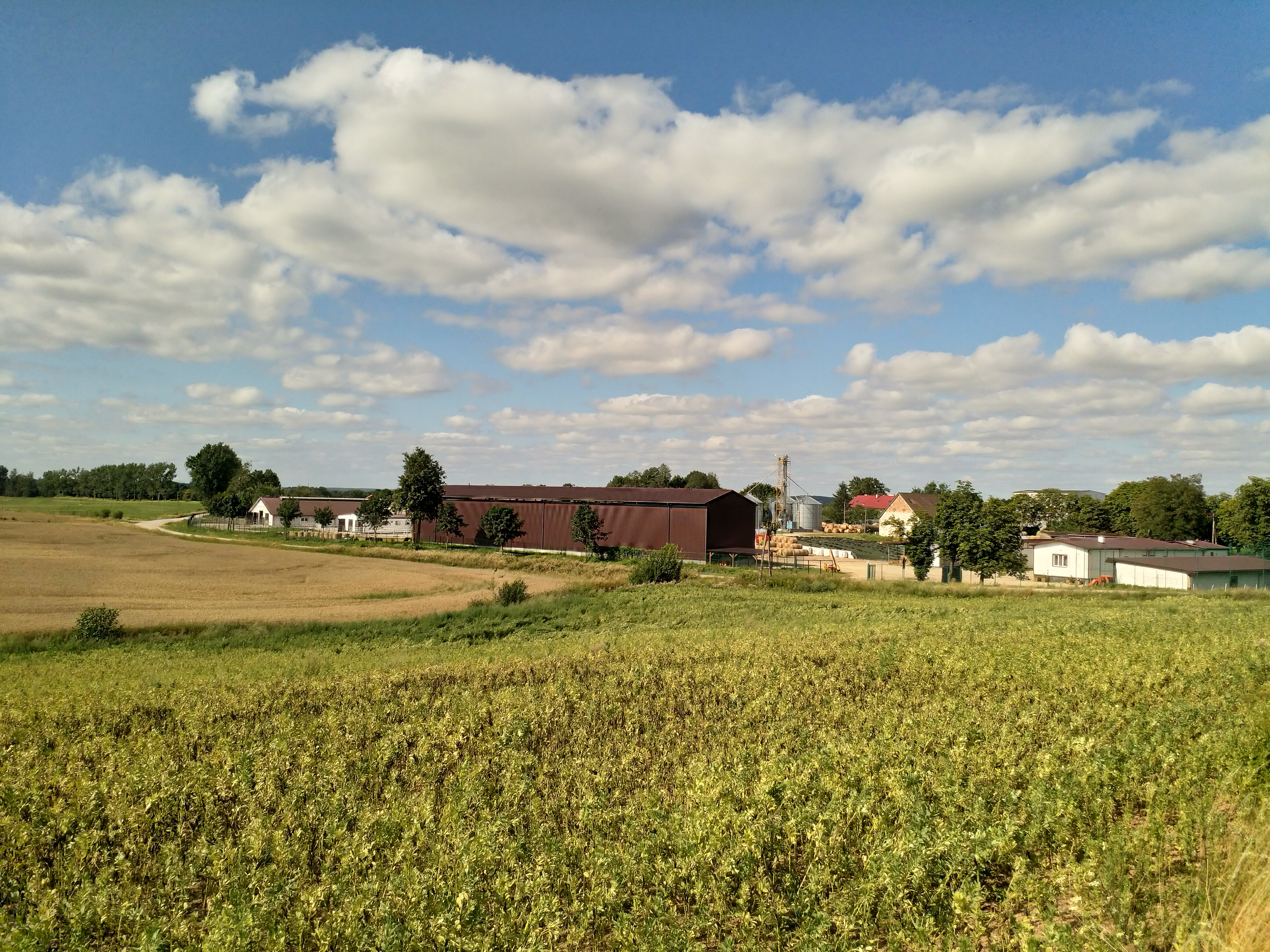

- Location within Poland
- Coordinates: 53°57′N 22°24′E
- Country: Poland
- Voivodeship: Warmian-Masurian
- County: Olecko
- Gmina: Świętajno
- Population: 180

Kukówko [kuˈkufkɔ] is a village in the administrative district of Gmina Świętajno, within Olecko County, Warmian-Masurian Voivodeship, in northern Poland.
