= Stacze, Olecko County =

Stacze
- Village
- Location within Poland
- Coordinates: 54°8′41″N 22°18′5″E
- Country: Poland
- Voivodeship: Warmian-Masurian
- County: Olecko
- Gmina: Kowale Oleckie
- Population: 260

Stacze [ˈstat͡ʂɛ] is a village in the administrative district of Gmina Kowale Oleckie, within Olecko County, Warmian-Masurian Voivodeship, in northern Poland.
