= Tuszyn, Pajęczno County =

Tuszyn
- Village
- Location within Poland
- Coordinates: 51°10′26″N 18°57′31″E
- Country: Poland
- Voivodeship: Łódź
- County: Pajęczno
- Gmina: Pajęczno

Tuszyn [ˈtuʂɨn] is a village in the administrative district of Gmina Pajęczno, within Pajęczno County, Łódź Voivodeship, in central Poland.
