= Jelonek, Warmian-Masurian Voivodeship =

Jelonek
- Village
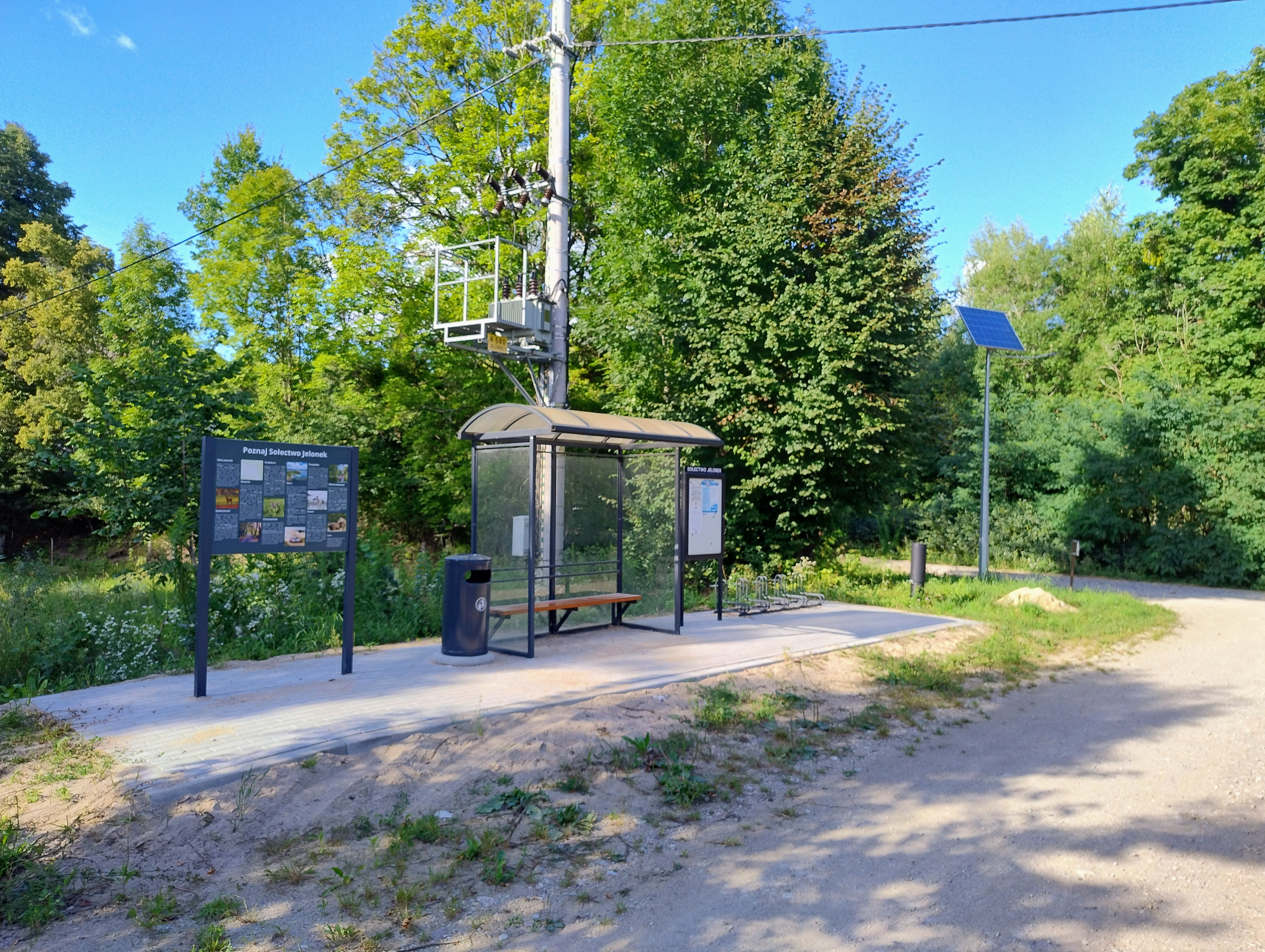

- Location within Poland
- Coordinates: 54°2′31″N 22°12′46″E
- Country: Poland
- Voivodeship: Warmian-Masurian
- County: Olecko
- Gmina: Świętajno

Jelonek [jɛˈlɔnɛk] is a village in the administrative district of Gmina Świętajno, within Olecko County, Warmian-Masurian Voivodeship, in northern Poland.
