= Kije, Warmian-Masurian Voivodeship =

Kije
- Village
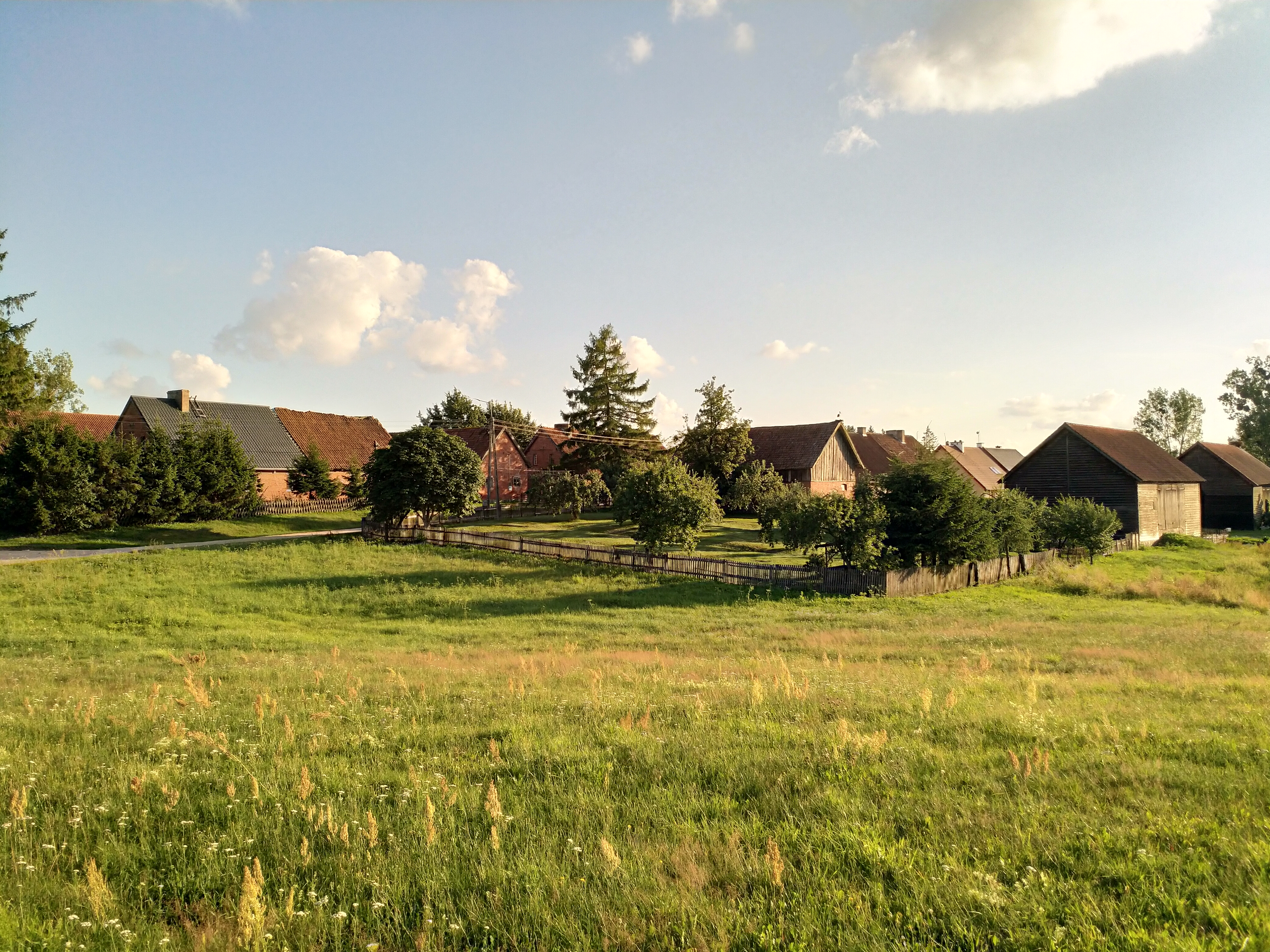

- Location within Poland
- Coordinates: 53°59′39″N 22°14′00″E
- Country: Poland
- Voivodeship: Warmian-Masurian
- County: Olecko
- Gmina: Świętajno

Kije [ˈkijɛ] is a village in the administrative district of Gmina Świętajno, within Olecko County, Warmian-Masurian Voivodeship, in northern Poland.
