= Niemsty =

- Village
- Location within Poland
- Coordinates: 54°05′04″N 22°19′18″E
- Country: Poland
- Voivodeship: Warmian-Masurian
- County: Olecko
- Gmina: Świętajno

Niemsty [ˈɲɛmstɨ] is a village in the administrative district of Gmina Świętajno, within Olecko County, Warmian-Masurian Voivodeship, in northern Poland.
