= Kiliany =

- Village
- Location within Poland
- Coordinates: 54°7′N 22°23′E
- Country: Poland
- Voivodeship: Warmian-Masurian
- County: Olecko
- Gmina: Kowale Oleckie

Kiliany [kiˈljanɨ] is a village in the administrative district of Gmina Kowale Oleckie, within Olecko County, Warmian-Masurian Voivodeship, in northern Poland. In 2021, the village had a population of 86 residents, reflecting a decline from 106 in 2011.
