= Pietrasze, Olecko County =

Pietrasze
- Village
- Location within Poland
- Coordinates: 54°01′04″N 22°10′42″E
- Country: Poland
- Voivodeship: Warmian-Masurian
- County: Olecko
- Gmina: Świętajno

Pietrasze [pjɛˈtraʂɛ] is a village in the administrative district of Gmina Świętajno of 118 residents, within Olecko County, Warmian-Masurian Voivodeship, in northern Poland.
