= Golubki =

- Village
- Location within Poland
- Coordinates: 54°6′N 22°27′E
- Country: Poland
- Voivodeship: Warmian-Masurian
- County: Olecko
- Gmina: Kowale Oleckie

Golubki [ɡɔˈlupki] is a village in the administrative district of Gmina Kowale Oleckie, within Olecko County, Warmian-Masurian Voivodeship, in northern Poland.
