= Gorczyce, Olecko County =

Gorczyce
- Village
- Location within Poland
- Coordinates: 54°9′N 22°29′E
- Country: Poland
- Voivodeship: Warmian-Masurian
- County: Olecko
- Gmina: Kowale Oleckie

Gorczyce [ɡɔrˈt͡ʂɨt͡sɛ] (German: Gortzitzen, from 1909 until 1945 Gartenberg) is a village in the administrative district of Gmina Kowale Oleckie, within Olecko County, Warmian-Masurian Voivodeship, in northern Poland.

== History ==
It has been mentioned in the Geographical Dictionary of the Kingdom of Poland in the late 19th century.
