= Dybowo, Olecko County =

Dybowo
- Village
- Location within Poland
- Coordinates: 54°5′N 22°18′E
- Country: Poland
- Voivodeship: Warmian-Masurian
- County: Olecko
- Gmina: Świętajno
- Founded: 1564
- Founder: Jan Dybowski
- Time zone: UTC+1 (CET)
  - Summer (DST): UTC+2 (CEST)
- Vehicle registration: NOE

Dybowo [dɨˈbɔvɔ] is a village in the administrative district of Gmina Świętajno, within Olecko County, Warmian-Masurian Voivodeship, in north-eastern Poland. It is part of the region of Masuria.

== History ==
Dybowo was founded in 1564 by Jan Dybowski, who bought land to establish a village. It was named after the founder. As of 1600, the population of the village was solely Polish. In 1939, it had a population of 359.
