= Borki, Olecko County =

Borki
- Village
- Location within Poland
- Coordinates: 54°5′8.4″N 22°11′57.3″E
- Country: Poland
- Voivodeship: (Warmian–Masurian Voivodeship) Warmian-Masurian
- County: Olecko
- Gmina: Świętajno

Borki [ˈbɔrki] (German Borken) is a village in the administrative district of Gmina Świętajno, within Olecko County, Warmian-Masurian Voivodeship, in northern Poland.
