= Nowe Gajęcice =

- Village
- Location within Poland
- Coordinates: 51°06′08″N 19°01′07″E
- Country: Poland
- Voivodeship: Łódź
- County: Pajęczno
- Gmina: Pajęczno

Nowe Gajęcice [ˈnɔvɛ ɡajɛnˈt͡ɕit͡sɛ] is a village in the administrative district of Gmina Pajęczno, within Pajęczno County, Łódź Voivodeship, in central Poland.
