= Wydrzynów =

Village in Łódź Voivodeship, Poland

- Village
- Location within Poland
- Coordinates: 51°8′N 18°57′E
- Country: Poland
- Voivodeship: Łódź
- County: Pajęczno
- Gmina: Pajęczno

Wydrzynów [vɨˈdʐɨnuf] is a village in the administrative district of Gmina Pajęczno, within Pajęczno County, Łódź Voivodeship, in central Poland.
