= Żydy, Warmian-Masurian Voivodeship =

Żydy
- Village
- Location within Poland
- Coordinates: 54°07′30″N 22°21′55″E
- Country: Poland
- Voivodeship: Warmian-Masurian
- County: Olecko
- Gmina: Kowale Oleckie

Żydy [ˈʐɨdɨ] (German: Sydden, 1938-45: Sidden) is a village in the administrative district of Gmina Kowale Oleckie, within Olecko County, Warmian-Masurian Voivodeship, in northern Poland.
