= Stare Gajęcice =

- Village
- Location within Poland
- Coordinates: 51°05′53″N 19°03′20″E
- Country: Poland
- Voivodeship: Łódź
- County: Pajęczno
- Gmina: Pajęczno

Stare Gajęcice [ˈstarɛ ɡajɛnˈt͡ɕit͡sɛ] is a village in the administrative district of Gmina Pajęczno, within Pajęczno County, Łódź Voivodeship, in central Poland.
