= Gmina Pajęczno =

Gmina Pajęczno Pajęczno Commune
- Gmina
- Coat of arms
- Interactive map of Gmina Pajęczno
- Coordinates (Pajęczno): 51°9′N 19°0′E
- Country: Poland
- Voivodeship: Łódź
- County: Pajęczno
- Seat: Pajęczno

Area
  - Total: 113.44 km^{2} (43.80 sq mi)

Population (2006)
  - Total: 11,655
  - Density: 102.74/km^{2} (266.10/sq mi)
  - Urban: 6,674
  - Rural: 4,981
- Website: https://www.pajeczno.pl/

Gmina Pajęczno is an urban-rural gmina (administrative district) in Pajęczno County, Łódź Voivodeship, in central Poland. Its seat is the town of Pajęczno, which lies approximately 78 kilometres (48 mi) south-west of the regional capital Łódź.

The gmina covers an area of 113.44 square kilometres (43.8 sq mi), and as of 2006 its total population is 11,655 (out of which the population of Pajęczno amounts to 6,674, and the population of the rural part of the gmina is 4,981).

== Villages ==
Apart from the town of Pajęczno, Gmina Pajęczno contains the villages and settlements of Barany, Czerkiesy, Dylów A, Dylów Rządowy, Dylów Szlachecki, Janki, Kurzna, Ładzin, Łężce, Lipina, Makowiska, Niwiska Dolne, Niwiska Górne, Nowe Gajęcice, Patrzyków, Podładzin, Podmurowaniec, Siedlec, Stare Gajęcice, Tuszyn, Wręczyca and Wydrzynów.

== Neighbouring gminas ==
Gmina Pajęczno is bordered by the gminas of Działoszyn, Kiełczygłów, Nowa Brzeźnica, Popów, Rząśnia, Siemkowice, Strzelce Wielkie and Sulmierzyce.
