= Gmina Kowale Oleckie =

Gmina Kowale Oleckie Kowale Oleckie Commune
- Gmina
- Coat of arms
- Interactive map of Gmina Kowale Oleckie
- Coordinates (Kowale Oleckie): 54°9′47″N 22°24′59″E
- Country: Poland
- Voivodeship: Warmian-Masurian
- County: Olecko
- Seat: Kowale Oleckie

Area
  - Total: 251.61 km^{2} (97.15 sq mi)

Population (2006)
  - Total: 5,371
  - Density: 21.35/km^{2} (55.29/sq mi)
- Website: http://www.kowale.fr.pl/

Gmina Kowale Oleckie is a rural gmina (administrative district) in Olecko County, Warmian-Masurian Voivodeship, in northern Poland. Its seat is the village of Kowale Oleckie, which lies approximately 16 kilometres (10 mi) north of Olecko and 133 km (83 mi) east of the regional capital Olsztyn.

The gmina covers an area of 251.61 square kilometres (97.1 sq mi), and as of 2006 its total population is 5,371.

== Villages ==
Gmina Kowale Oleckie contains the villages and settlements of Bialskie Pola, Borkowiny, Chełchy, Cicha Wólka, Czerwony Dwór, Czukty, Daniele, Dorsze, Drozdowo, Golubie Wężewskie, Golubki, Gorczyce, Guzy, Jabłonowo, Kiliany, Kowale Oleckie, Lakiele, Monety, Rogówko, Sokółki, Stacze, Stożne, Szarejki, Szeszki, Szwałk, Wężewo, Zawady Oleckie and Żydy.

== Neighbouring gminas ==
Gmina Kowale Oleckie is bordered by the gminas of Banie Mazurskie, Filipów, Gołdap, Kruklanki, Olecko and Świętajno.
