= Kurzna =

- Village
- Location within Poland
- Coordinates: 51°10′N 19°2′E
- Country: Poland
- Voivodeship: Łódź
- County: Pajęczno
- Gmina: Pajęczno

Kurzna [ˈkuʐna] is a village in the administrative district of Gmina Pajęczno, within Pajęczno County, Łódź Voivodeship, in central Poland.
