= Szarejki, Olecko County =

Szarejki
- Village
- Location within Poland
- Coordinates: 54°7′53″N 22°24′31″E
- Country: Poland
- Voivodeship: Warmian-Masurian
- County: Olecko
- Gmina: Kowale Oleckie
- Population: 130

Szarejki [ʂaˈrɛi̯ki] is a village in the administrative district of Gmina Kowale Oleckie, within Olecko County, Warmian-Masurian Voivodeship, in northern Poland.
