= Bialskie Pola =

- Village
- Location within Poland
- Coordinates: 54°7′58″N 22°31′29″E
- Country: Poland
- Voivodeship: Warmian-Masurian
- County: Olecko
- Gmina: Kowale Oleckie
- Population: 60

Bialskie Pola [ˈbjalskʲɛ ˈpɔla] is a village in the administrative district of Gmina Kowale Oleckie, within Olecko County, Warmian-Masurian Voivodeship, in northern Poland.
