= Szeszki, Gmina Kowale Oleckie =

Szeszki
- Village
- Location within Poland
- Coordinates: 54°11′6″N 22°20′58″E
- Country: Poland
- Voivodeship: Warmian-Masurian
- County: Olecko
- Gmina: Kowale Oleckie
- Population: 60

Szeszki [ˈʂɛʂki] is a village in the administrative district of Gmina Kowale Oleckie, within Olecko County, Warmian-Masurian Voivodeship, in northern Poland.
