= Świętajno, Olecko County =

Świętajno
- Village
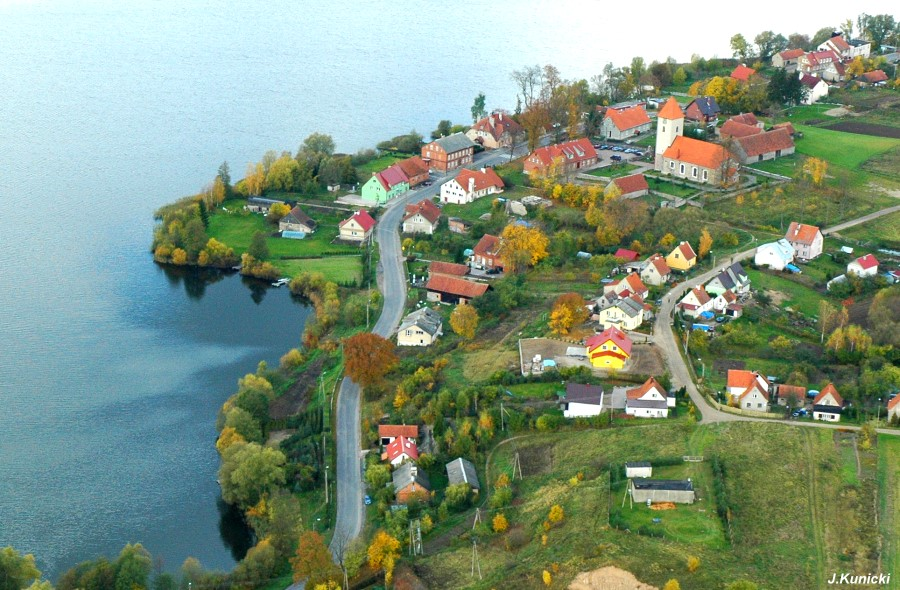
- Aerial view

- Location within Poland
- Coordinates: 54°0′5″N 22°19′3″E
- Country: Poland
- Voivodeship: Warmian-Masurian
- County: Olecko
- Gmina: Świętajno
- Founded: 1554

Population
  - Total: 1,600
- Time zone: UTC+1 (CET)
  - Summer (DST): UTC+2 (CEST)
- Vehicle registration: NOE
- Website: http://www.bip.bazagmin.pl/swietajno-gol/

Świętajno (Polish pronunciation: [ɕfjɛnˈtajnɔ]; German: Schwentainen) is a village in Olecko County, Warmian-Masurian Voivodeship, in north-eastern Poland. It is the seat of the gmina (administrative district) called Gmina Świętajno. It is located on the northern and eastern shore of Lake Świętajno in the region of Masuria.

== History ==
The village was founded in 1554 and was inhabited by Poles. As of 1719, the village had an exclusively Polish population.
