= Niwiska Górne =

- Village
- Location within Poland
- Coordinates: 51°7′N 18°59′E
- Country: Poland
- Voivodeship: Łódź
- County: Pajęczno
- Gmina: Pajęczno

Niwiska Górne [niˈviska ˈɡurnɛ] is a village in the administrative district of Gmina Pajęczno, within Pajęczno County, Łódź Voivodeship, in central Poland.
