= Leśniki, Warmian-Masurian Voivodeship =

Leśniki
- Village
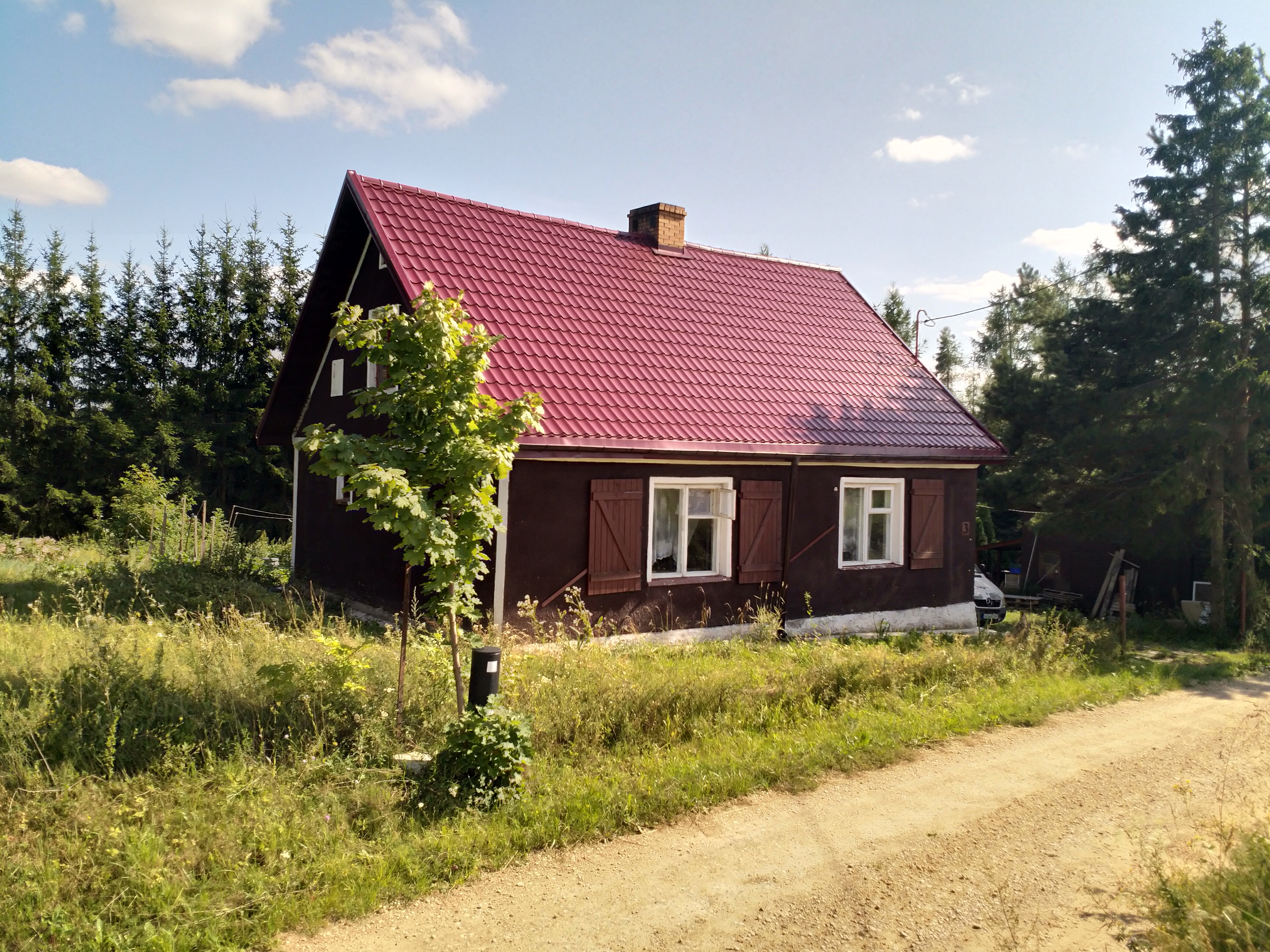

- Location within Poland
- Coordinates: 53°56′17″N 22°23′21″E
- Country: Poland
- Voivodeship: Warmian-Masurian
- County: Olecko
- Gmina: Świętajno

Leśniki [lɛɕˈniki] (German Leschnicken) is a village in the administrative district of Gmina Świętajno, within Olecko County, Warmian-Masurian Voivodeship, in northern Poland.
