= Zalesie, Olecko County =

Zalesie
- Village
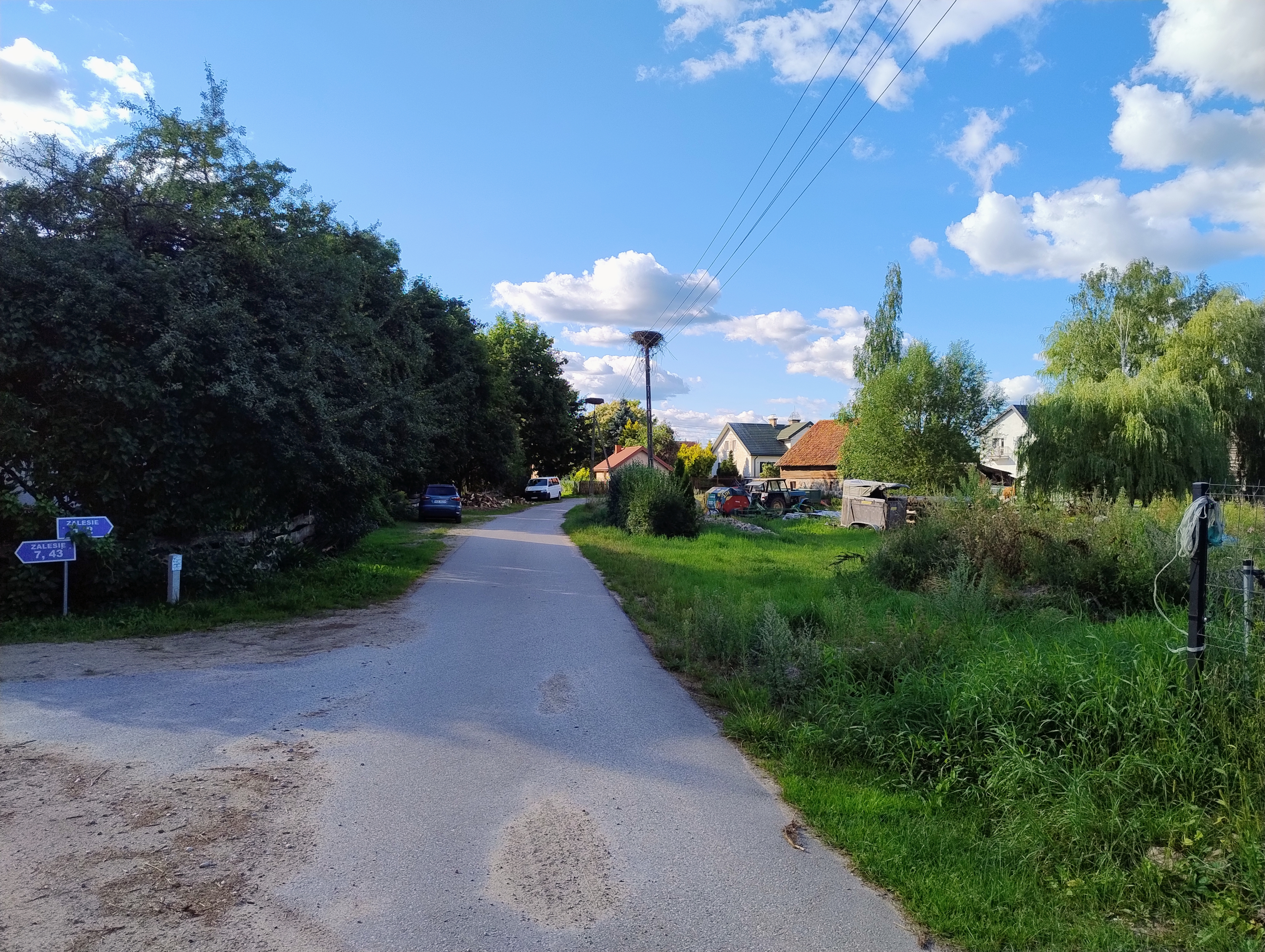

- Location within Poland
- Coordinates: 54°3′N 22°15′E
- Country: Poland
- Voivodeship: Warmian-Masurian
- County: Olecko
- Gmina: Świętajno

Zalesie [zaˈlɛɕɛ] is a village in the administrative district of Gmina Świętajno, within Olecko County, Warmian-Masurian Voivodeship, in northern Poland.
