= Czerwony Dwór, Olecko County =

Czerwony Dwór
- Village
- Location within Poland
- Coordinates: 54°07′24″N 22°11′12″E
- Country: Poland
- Voivodeship: Warmian-Masurian
- County: Olecko
- Gmina: Kowale Oleckie

Czerwony Dwór [t͡ʂɛrˈvɔnɨ ˈdvur] is a village in the administrative district of Gmina Kowale Oleckie, within Olecko County, Warmian-Masurian Voivodeship, in northern Poland.
