= Barany, Łódź Voivodeship =

Barany
- Village
- Location within Poland
- Coordinates: 51°10′10″N 19°2′57″E
- Country: Poland
- Voivodeship: Łódź
- County: Pajęczno
- Gmina: Pajęczno

Barany [baˈranɨ] is a village in the administrative district of Gmina Pajęczno, within Pajęczno County, Łódź Voivodeship, in central Poland.
