= Baranyi =

Baranyi is a surname. Notable people with the surname include:

- John Baranyi (born 1961), Independent candidate in 2000 and Green Party candidate in 2003 and 2004 for the House of Commons of Canada
- Szabolcs Baranyi (1944–2016), former professional tennis player from Hungary
