= Polom, Kočevje =

Polom
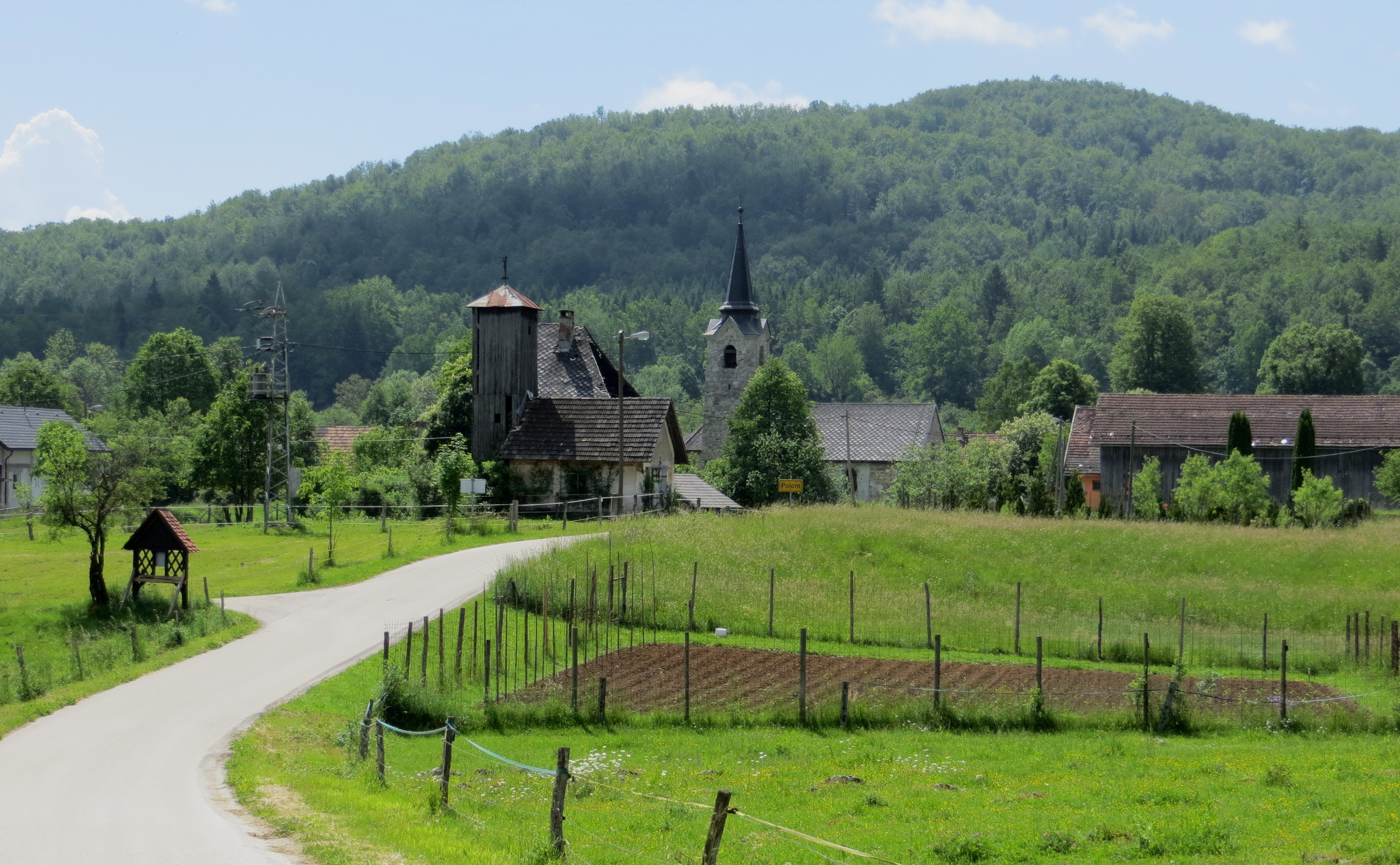

- Location in Slovenia
- Coordinates: 45°44′21.58″N 14°51′23.66″E
- Country: Slovenia
- Traditional region: Lower Carniola
- Statistical region: Southeast Slovenia
- Municipality: Kočevje

Area
  - Total: 7.64 km^{2} (2.95 sq mi)
- Elevation: 372.7 m (1,223 ft)

Population (2002)
  - Total: 47
- Postal code: 1332

Polom (pronounced [pɔˈlɔm] or [ˈpɔːlɔm]; German: Ebenthal or Ebental; Gottscheerish: Ebentou, Ebntol) is a settlement in the Municipality of Kočevje in southern Slovenia. The area is part of the traditional region of Lower Carniola and is now included in the Southeast Slovenia Statistical Region.

== Name ==
Polom first appeared in written records under its German name, Ebenthal, in 1763–1787. The Slovenian name Polom may be derived from the common noun polom 'place where the wind or snow has felled trees', or from the prepositional phrase pod lomom, literally 'below where a ridge transitions into a steep slope' or 'below a thicket'. The German name Ebent(h)al means 'level valley' and is derived from the geography of the village.

== History ==
Polom was a Gottschee German village. According to the land registry of 1574, Polom had only one and a half full-sized farms, divided into two three-eighths-farms and three quarter-farms, corresponding to between 40 and 45 residents. In 1770 there were 26 houses in the village. A part-time school was established in the village in 1858, and a regular school in 1859. Before the Second World War the village had 36 houses and a population of 148. During the Second World War the entire population of the village was evicted, with the exception of one family. There was a Partisan stronghold in the village during the war. Polom was not burned during the war, but it came under aerial bombardment from Italian and German forces, and rocket attacks from Allied forces. No classes were held in the village school between 1941 and 1948. After the war, settlers from various parts of Slovenia moved to the village. The Polom volunteer fire department became a founding unit of the Kočevje municipal fire department on 28 August 1955.

== Church ==
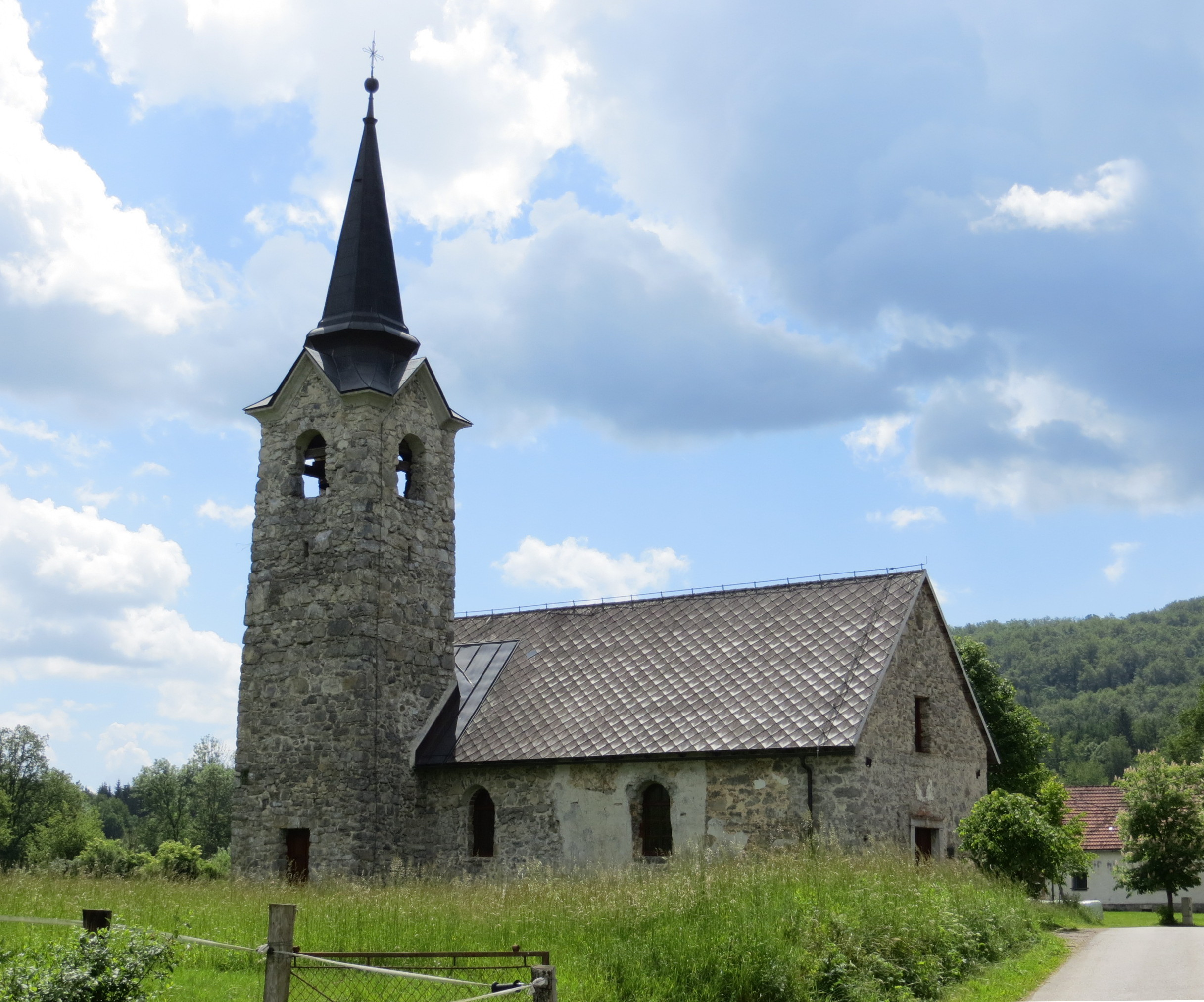
View from north

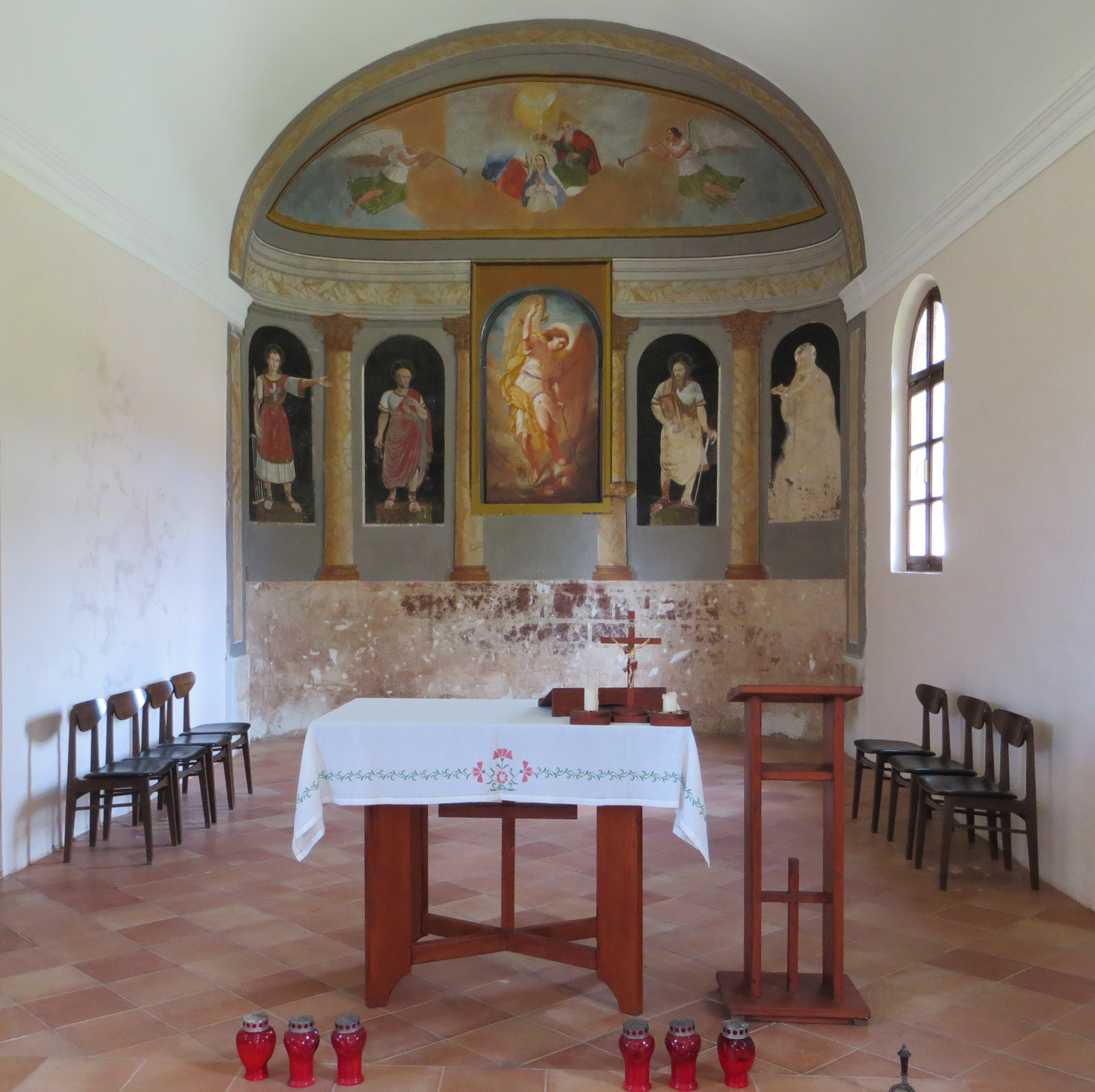
Chancel

Saint Michael's Church

The local church is dedicated to Saint Michael and belongs to the Parish of Hinje. It dates to the 17th century.

== Notable people ==
Notable people that were born or lived in Polom include:

- Albin Belar (1864–1939), seismologist
- Andrej Likar (1826–1865), priest, local historian, and writer
