= Połom, Olecko County =

Połom
- Village
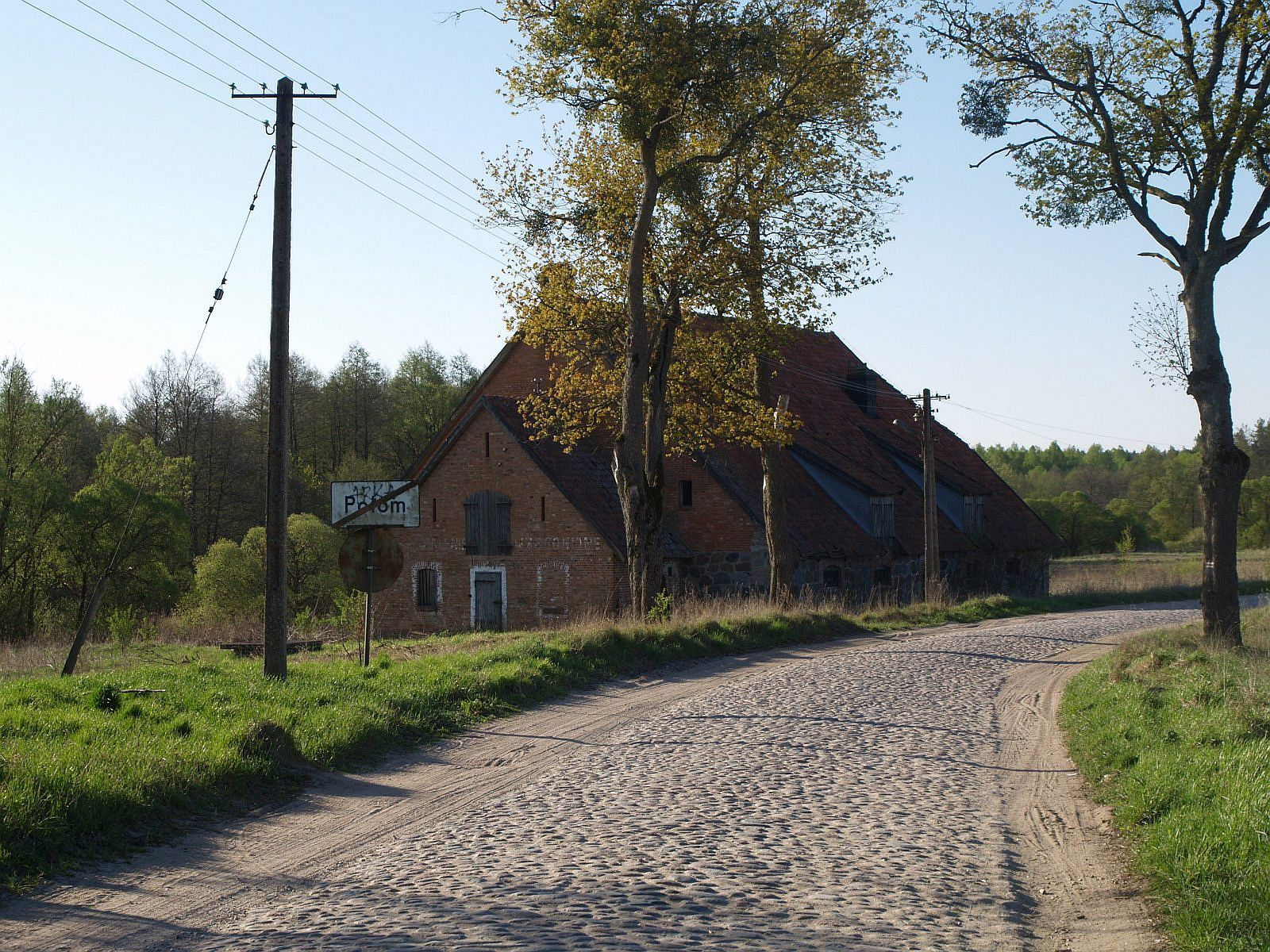

- Location within Poland
- Coordinates: 53°59′N 22°17′E
- Country: Poland
- Voivodeship: Warmian-Masurian
- County: Olecko
- Gmina: Świętajno

Połom [ˈpɔwɔm] is a village in the administrative district of Gmina Świętajno, within Olecko County, Warmian-Masurian Voivodeship, in northern Poland.
