= Sulkovec =

- Municipality
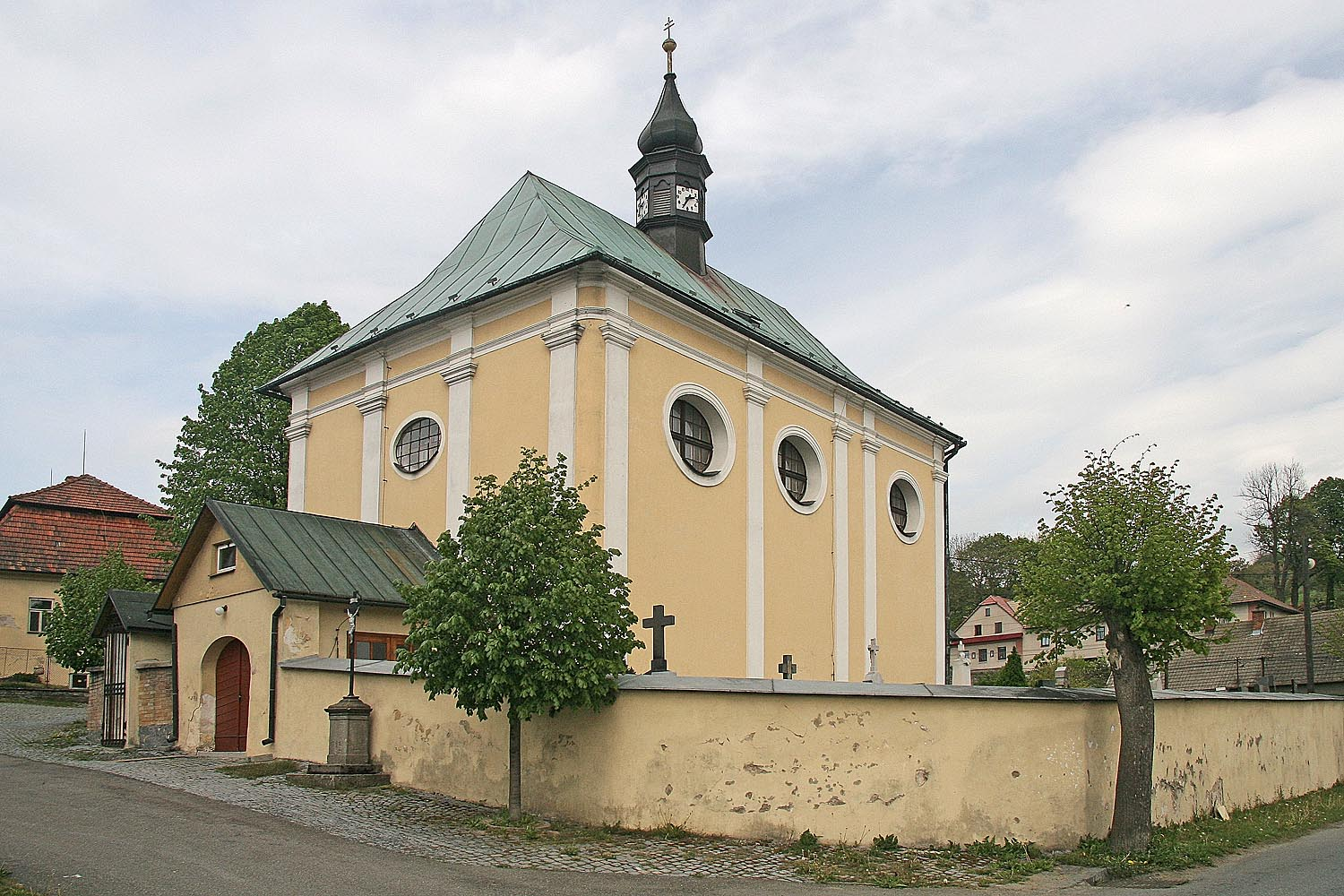
- Church of Saint Gall

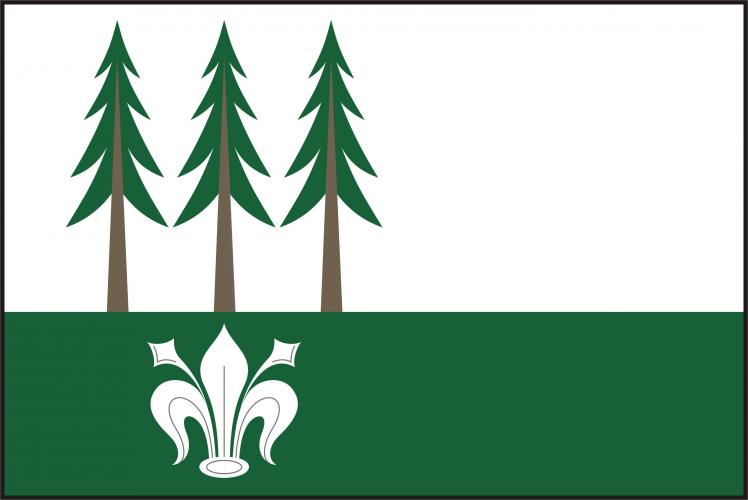
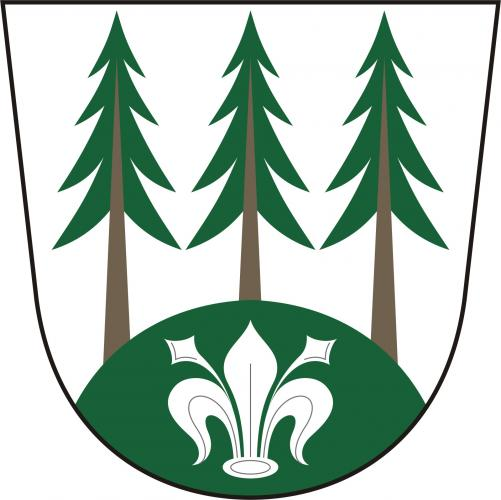
- Flag Coat of arms

- Location in the Czech Republic
- Coordinates: 49°36′34″N 16°18′35″E
- Country: Czech Republic
- Region: Vysočina
- District: Žďár nad Sázavou
- First mentioned: 1459

Area
  - Total: 8.55 km^{2} (3.30 sq mi)
- Elevation: 683 m (2,241 ft)

Population (2026-01-01)
  - Total: 159
  - Density: 18.6/km^{2} (48.2/sq mi)
- Time zone: UTC+1 (CET)
  - Summer (DST): UTC+2 (CEST)
- Postal code: 592 65
- Website: www.sulkovec.cz

Sulkovec is a municipality and village in Žďár nad Sázavou District in the Vysočina Region of the Czech Republic. It has about 200 inhabitants.

Sulkovec lies approximately 28 kilometres (17 mi) east of Žďár nad Sázavou, 58 km (36 mi) north-east of Jihlava, and 146 km (91 mi) east of Prague.

== Administrative division ==
Sulkovec consists of two municipal parts (in brackets population according to the 2021 census):

- Sulkovec (95)
- Polom (45)

== Demographics ==
Historical population
Year	Pop.	±%
1869	526	—
1880	545	+3.6%
1890	556	+2.0%
1900	579	+4.1%
1910	511	−11.7%
1921	508	−0.6%
1930	502	−1.2%
1950	382	−23.9%
1961	383	+0.3%
1970	340	−11.2%
1980	277	−18.5%
1991	242	−12.6%
2001	207	−14.5%
2011	174	−15.9%
2021	140	−19.5%
Source: Censuses
