= Cichy (surname) =

Cichy (Polish pronunciation: [ˈt͡ɕixɨ]; feminine: Cicha) is a Polish-language surname, meaning "quiet" or "silent". It is related to several other surnames:

Language	Masculine	Feminine
Polish	Cichy	Cicha
Czech	Tichý	Tichá
Slovak	Cichý	Cichá
Russian (Romanization)	Тихий (Tikhiy, Tikhy, Tikhkij, Tichij)	
Ukrainian (Romanization)	Тихий (Tykhyy, Tykhyi, Tykhyj, Tychyj)	

== People ==
- Jack Cichy (born 1996), American football player
- Joe Cichy (born 1948), American football safety
- Josef Cichy (1852–1913), Silesian politician and manufacturer
- Leszek Cichy (1951), Polish mountaineer and entrepreneur
- Stefan Cichy (born 1939), Polish Catholic bishop
- Tomasz Cichy (born 1976), Polish field hockey player
- Witold Cichy (born 1948), Polish footballer (defender)
