= Gmina Świętajno, Olecko County =

Gmina Świętajno Świętajno Commune
- Gmina
- Coat of arms
- Interactive map of Gmina Świętajno
- Coordinates (Świętajno): 54°0′5″N 22°19′3″E
- Country: Poland
- Voivodeship: Warmian-Masurian
- County: Olecko
- Seat: Świętajno

Area
  - Total: 214.91 km^{2} (82.98 sq mi)

Population (2006)
  - Total: 4,011
  - Density: 18.66/km^{2} (48.34/sq mi)
- Website: http://www.swietajno.mtnet.pl/

Gmina Świętajno is a rural gmina (administrative district) in Olecko County, Warmian-Masurian Voivodeship, in northern Poland. Its seat is the village of Świętajno, which lies approximately 13 kilometres (8 mi) west of Olecko and 122 km (76 mi) east of the regional capital Olsztyn.

The gmina covers an area of 214.91 square kilometres (83.0 sq mi), and as of 2006 its total population is 4,011.

== Villages ==
Gmina Świętajno contains the villages and settlements of Barany, Borki, Chełchy, Cichy, Dudki, Dworackie, Dybowo, Gryzy, Jelonek, Jurki, Jurkowo, Kije, Krzywe, Kukówko, Leśniki, Mazury, Niemsty, Orzechówko, Pietrasze, Połom, Rogojny, Rogowszczyzna, Smolnik, Sulejki, Świdrówko, Świętajno, Wronki and Zalesie.

== Neighbouring gminas ==
Gmina Świętajno is bordered by the gminas of Ełk, Kowale Oleckie, Kruklanki, Olecko, Stare Juchy and Wydminy.
