= Barany, Olecko County =

Barany
- Village
- Location within Poland
- Coordinates: 54°5′31″N 22°20′29″E
- Country: Poland
- Voivodeship: Warmian-Masurian
- County: Olecko
- Gmina: Świętajno
- Founded: 1562
- Population: 60
- Time zone: UTC+1 (CET)
  - Summer (DST): UTC+2 (CEST)
- Vehicle registration: NOE

Barany [baˈranɨ] is a village in the administrative district of Gmina Świętajno, within Olecko County, Warmian-Masurian Voivodeship, in north-eastern Poland. It is part of the region of Masuria.

== History ==
Barany was founded in 1562 by Stańko Baran and Błażej Krzywiński, who bought land to establish a village. It was named after one of its founders. As of 1600, the population of the village was solely Polish. In 1939, it had a population of 147.
