= Kowale Oleckie =

- Village
- Location within Poland
- Coordinates: 54°9′47″N 22°24′59″E
- Country: Poland
- Voivodeship: Warmian-Masurian
- County: Olecko
- Gmina: Kowale Oleckie
- Population: 2,400
- Website: http://www.kowale.fr.pl

Kowale Oleckie [kɔˈvalɛ ɔˈlɛt͡skʲɛ] is a village in Olecko County, Warmian-Masurian Voivodeship, in northern Poland. It is the seat of the gmina (administrative district) called Gmina Kowale Oleckie.
