= Chełchy, Gmina Świętajno =

Chełchy
- Village
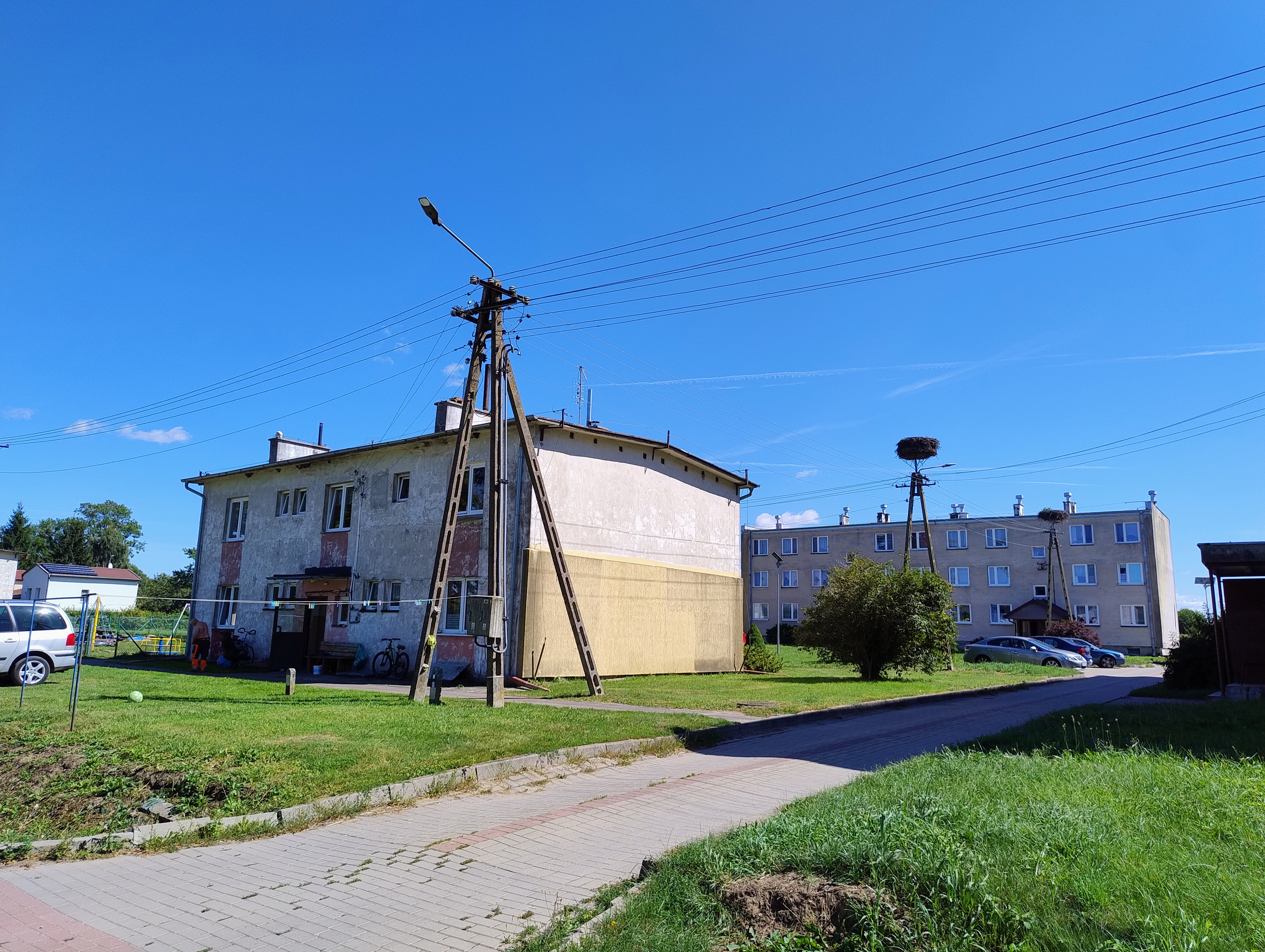

- Location within Poland
- Coordinates: 54°02′33″N 22°16′45″E
- Country: Poland
- Voivodeship: Warmian-Masurian
- County: Olecko
- Gmina: Świętajno

Chełchy [ˈxɛu̯xɨ] is a village in the administrative district of Gmina Świętajno, within Olecko County, Warmian-Masurian Voivodeship, in northern Poland.
