= Polom (Gornji Milanovac) =

Polom Полом
- Village
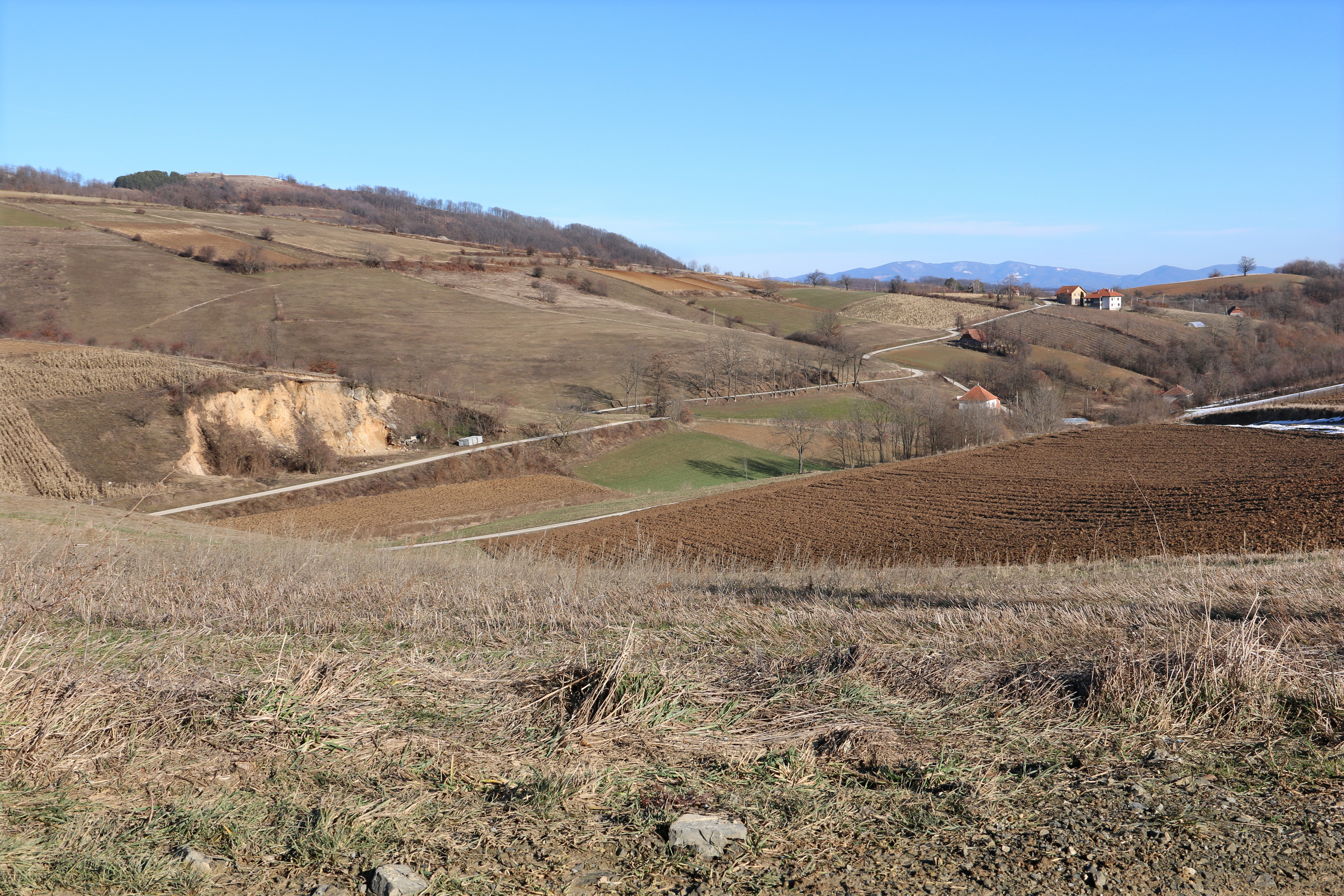
- The village of Polom

- Location within Serbia
- Coordinates: 44°07′16″N 20°13′33″E
- Country: Serbia
- District: Moravica District
- Municipality: Gornji Milanovac

Population (2002)
  - Total: 275
- Time zone: UTC+1 (CET)
  - Summer (DST): UTC+2 (CEST)

Polom is a village in the municipality of Gornji Milanovac, Serbia. According to the 2002 census, the village has a population of 275 people.

The village was active in the Serbian Revolution, being organized into the knežina (administrative unit) of Brusnica (Takovo) during the First Serbian Uprising (1804–13). The revolutionary Markelja Draškić came from the village.

== Notable people ==
- Milorad Drašković
- Pero Petrović
