= Tichy (surname) =

The surname Tichy may refer to:

- Tichý (surname), a Czech-language surname
- Brian Tichy (born 1968), American drummer
- Ekkehard Tichy, German Luftwaffe ace
- Gérard Tichy (1920–1992), Spanish actor
- Hans Tichy (1861–1925), Austrian painter
- Herbert Tichy (1912–1987), Austrian author, geologist, journalist and climber
- Katerina Tichy (born 1974), Canadian Olympic alpine skier
- Lajos Tichy (1935–1999), Hungarian footballer
- Lester C. Tichy (1905–1981), American modern architect
- Mattias Tichy (born 1974), Swedish rower
- Noel Tichy, American management consultant, author and educator
- Robert F. Tichy (born 1957), Austrian mathematician
- Roland Tichy (born 1955), German economist, writer and journalist
- Susan Tichy (born 1952), American poet
- Walter F. Tichy (born 1952), German professor of computer science

== Fictional characters ==
- Ijon Tichy, a fictional character who appears in several works of the Polish science fiction writer Stanisław Lem, including The Star Diaries.
