= Cichy, Warmian-Masurian Voivodeship =

Cichy
- Village
- Location within Poland
- Coordinates: 54°5′N 22°18′E
- Country: Poland
- Voivodeship: Warmian-Masurian
- County: Olecko
- Gmina: Świętajno

Cichy [ˈt͡ɕixɨ] is a village in the administrative district of Gmina Świętajno, within Olecko County, Warmian-Masurian Voivodeship, in northern Poland.
