= Tichý =

Tichý (feminine form: Tichá) is a Czech surname meaning literally "quiet" or "silent". Notable people include:

- Andrzej Tichý (born 1978), Swedish writer
- Irena Tichá (born 1943), Czech volleyball player
- Jana Tichá (born 1965), Czech astronomer
- Jindra Tichá (born 1937), Czech-New Zealand academic and writer
- Jiří Tichý (1933–2016), Czech football player
- Martin Tichý (born 1968), Czech rower
- Milan Tichý (born 1969), Czech ice hockey defenceman
- Miloš Tichý (born 1966), Czech astronomer
- Miroslav Tichý (1926–2011), Czech photographer
- Otto Albert Tichý (1890–1973), Czech composer, teacher and organist
- Pavel Tichý (1936–1994), Czech logician, philosopher and mathematician
- Zdena Tichá (born 1952), Czech rower

== See also ==
- Cichy (surname), Polish surname with the same meaning
- Tichy (surname)
- Ticha (disambiguation)
