= Krupin =

Krupin may refer to the following places:

- Krupin, Elbląg County in Warmian-Masurian Voivodeship (north Poland)
- Krupin, Ełk County in Warmian-Masurian Voivodeship (north Poland)
- Krupin, Olecko County in Warmian-Masurian Voivodeship (north Poland)
- Krupin, West Pomeranian Voivodeship (north-west Poland)

== See also ==
- Krupin (surname)
