= Norki =

- Location within Poland
- Coordinates: 53°57′07″N 22°32′11″E
- Country: Poland
- Voivodeship: Warmian-Masurian
- County: Olecko
- Municipality: Wieliczki
- Time zone: UTC+1 (CET)
  - Summer (DST): UTC+2 (CEST)
- Postal code: 19-404

Norki, until 1945 known as Nordenberg, is a hamlet in Warmian-Masurian Voivodeship, Poland located in the Gmina Wieliczki, Olecko County. It was established in 1822 as a folwark of nearby village of Nory.
