= Niedźwiedzkie =

Niedźwiedzkie may refer to the following places:

- Niedźwiedzkie, Podlaskie Voivodeship (north-east Poland)
- Niedźwiedzkie, Ełk County in Warmian-Masurian Voivodeship (north Poland)
- Niedźwiedzkie, Olecko County in Warmian-Masurian Voivodeship (north Poland)
