= Dybowo =

Dybowo may refer to the following places:

- Dybowo, Kuyavian-Pomeranian Voivodeship (north-central Poland)
- Dybowo, Pomeranian Voivodeship (north Poland)
- Dybowo, Ełk County in Warmian-Masurian Voivodeship (north Poland)
- Dybowo, Mrągowo County in Warmian-Masurian Voivodeship (north Poland)
- Dybowo, Olecko County in Warmian-Masurian Voivodeship (north Poland)
- Dybowo, Szczytno County in Warmian-Masurian Voivodeship (north Poland)
