= Bartkowski =

Bartkowski (feminine: Bartkowska , plural: Bartkowscy), a Polish-language surname, may refer to

== People with the surname ==
- Czesław Bartkowski (born 1943), Polish jazz musician; see Enigmatic (album)
- Jakub Bartkowski (born 1991), Polish footballer
- Matt Bartkowski (born 1988), American ice hockey player
- Steve Bartkowski (born 1952), American football player

== Other uses ==
- Nick Bartkowski, a character from the 1999 film Disorganized Crime
- Bartkowski Dwór, a settlement in Poland
