= 11th Siberian Rifle Division =

- 11-я Сибирская стрелковая дивизия
- Active: 1910–1918
- Country: Russian Empire
- Branch: Russian Imperial Army
- Role: Infantry
- Engagements: World War I

The 11th Siberian Rifle Division (Russian: 11-я Сибирская стрелковая дивизия; 11-ya Sibirskaya Strelkovaya Diviziya) was an infantry formation of the Russian Imperial Army.

== History ==
The division was formed in 1910. On 11 June 1910, Lieutenant General Sergei Nekrasov took command of the division. Nekrasov was still the division commander on 1 June 1911. The division was headquartered at Omsk from at least February 1913. From at least 1 January 1913, its 1st Brigade was at Tomsk with the 41st Siberian Rifle Regiment. From at least February 1913, its 2nd Brigade was headquartered at Omsk. In 1914, the division was part of the Omsk Military District. It consisted of the 1st Brigade at Omsk with the 41st (Novonikolayevsk) and 42nd (Tomsk) Siberian Rifle Regiments, and the 2nd Brigade at Nikolayevsk with the 43rd (Omsk) and 44th (Omsk) Siberian Rifle Regiments. The division also included the 11th Siberian Rifle Artillery Brigade, a Siberian Separate Mountain Horse-Artillery Battery and a Siberian Separate Howitzer Battery.

=== World War I ===
After the beginning of World War I, the division was moved to the front in mid-August 1914 and became part of the 1st Turkestan Army Corps. The corps, part of the 10th Army, advanced from the Osowiec Fortress against Lyck during late September. On 22 September the division and the rest of the corps reached the German border, and two days later captured Lyck. Advancing father to the north, they reached the Klein Oletzko lake, 30 kilometers north of the border. To the south, on 28 September, the 11th Division advanced through Pisanitsa while attacking towards Prostki. However, Northwestern Front commander Nikolai Ruzsky decided to withdraw the 10th Army back to Russian territory. On 29 September, the main forces of the corps withdrew to Shchuchyn and Grajewo in Russian territory. The corps was then moved to the area of Ruzhany and Pułtusk.

The division was disbanded in 1918.
