= Krystyn Lach-Szyrma =

Polish philosopher (1790–1866)

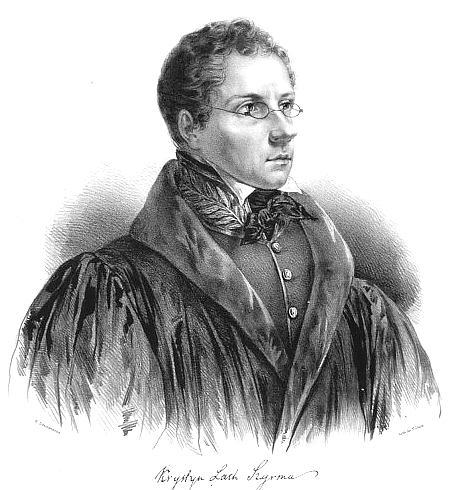
- Born: December 17, 1790; Woynassen, East Prussia, Kingdom of Prussia
- Died: April 21, 1866 (aged 75); Devonport, Devon, England
- Education: Imperial University of Vilnius
- Parents: Adam Lach (father); Katarzyna née Heydukówna (mother)

Krystyn Lach Szyrma (17 December 1790, Wojnasy; 21 April 1866, Devonport, Devon) was a professor of philosophy at Warsaw University. He was also a writer, journalist, translator and political activist.

== Life ==
Szyrma was professor of philosophy at Warsaw University from 1824 to 1831. He left no philosophical writings.

Szyrma was one of nearly all the university professors of philosophy in Poland before the November 1830–31 Uprising who held a position that shunned both Positivism and metaphysical speculation, affined to the Scottish philosophers but linked in certain respects to Kantian critique.

== See also ==
- History of philosophy in Poland
- List of Poles
- W. S. Lach-Szyrma
