= Rozynsk Wielki =

Rozynsk Wielki may refer to the following places in Poland:

- Rożyńsk Wielki, Gołdap County
- Różyńsk Wielki Ełk County
