= Gorczyce, Ełk County =

Gorczyce
- Village
- Location within Poland
- Coordinates: 53°40′N 22°22′E
- Country: Poland
- Voivodeship: Warmian-Masurian
- County: Ełk
- Gmina: Prostki
- Population (approx.): 110

Gorczyce [ɡɔrˈt͡ʂɨt͡sɛ] (German: Gorczitzen) is a village in the administrative district of Gmina Prostki, within Ełk County, Warmian-Masurian Voivodeship, in northern Poland. It is a sołectwo of Prostki.

== History ==
Before the 13th century, the region surrounding present day Gorczyce was inhabited by Baltic Prussians and was known as Galindia. Following the Prussian Crusade it was conquered by the Teutonic Knights and became part of the Monastic State of the Teutonic Order. After the secularization of the Teutonic Order in 1525, the region became part of Ducal Prussia, which was established as a vassal state of the Crown of the Kingdom of Poland. Beginning in the 15th century, many Polish settlers (called Mazurs) from the Mazovia region of Poland, moved into the southern parts of the duchy (later known as the Mazury region). Areas that had large numbers of Polish language speakers were known as the Polish Departments. In 1657, the duchy passed under the full sovereignty of Brandenburg. Before 1945, Gorczyce was part of the Prussian and then German region of East Prussia. The village was historically called Gorczitzen, written Gortzitzen in the 1881 Geographical Dictionary of the Kingdom of Poland, and is recorded as Gramatzken in a 1484 document. In 1928 it was renamed to Deumenrode.

Under Prussian administration, it was administered with Borki (Borken), their combined population being 286 in 1885. Its population was 205 in 1933, 186 in 1939. With the defeat of Germany in World War II, it became part of Poland and was renamed to Gorczyce.

== Transport ==
Gorczyce is on route 1680N, which links Prostki with Biała Piska.
