= Rhynie =

Rhynie may refer to:

- Rhynie, Aberdeenshire, a village in Scotland
  - Rhynie chert, a sedimentary deposit located near the town
- Rhynie, South Australia

== See also ==
- Rynie, a village in Poland
