= 11th Rifle Division =

11th Rifle Division can refer to:

- 11th Rifle Division (Soviet Union)
- 11th Guards Rifle Division
- 11th Siberian Rifle Division
- 11th Motor Rifle Division "Sultan Sanjar"

== See also ==
- 11th Division (disambiguation)
