= Sokółki =

Sokółki may refer to the following places:

- Sokółki, Greater Poland Voivodeship (west-central Poland)
- Sokółki, Ełk County in Warmian-Masurian Voivodeship (north Poland)
- Sokółki, Olecko County in Warmian-Masurian Voivodeship (north Poland)
