= Guty Rożyńskie =

- Village
- Location within Poland
- Coordinates: 53°38′N 22°16′E
- Country: Poland
- Voivodeship: Warmian-Masurian
- County: Ełk
- Gmina: Prostki
- Population: 60

Guty Rożyńskie [ˈɡutɨ rɔˈʐɨɲskʲɛ] is a village in the administrative district of Gmina Prostki, within Ełk County, Warmian-Masurian Voivodeship, in northern Poland.
