= Nowy Młyn, Olecko County =

Nowy Młyn
- Village
- Location within Poland
- Coordinates: 53°58′03″N 22°33′13″E
- Country: Poland
- Voivodeship: Warmian-Masurian
- County: Olecko
- Gmina: Wieliczki

Nowy Młyn [ˈnɔvɨ ˈmwɨn] is a village in the administrative district of Gmina Wieliczki, within Olecko County, Warmian-Masurian Voivodeship, in northern Poland.
