= Krzywe, Ełk County =

Krzywe
- Village
- Location within Poland
- Coordinates: 53°45′7″N 22°35′37″E
- Country: Poland
- Voivodeship: Warmian-Masurian
- County: Ełk
- Gmina: Prostki

Krzywe [ˈkʂɨvɛ] is a village in the administrative district of Gmina Prostki, within Ełk County, Warmian-Masurian Voivodeship, in northern Poland.
