= Sołtmany, Ełk County =

Sołtmany
- Village
- Location within Poland
- Coordinates: 53°43′N 22°24′E
- Country: Poland
- Voivodeship: Warmian-Masurian
- County: Ełk
- Gmina: Prostki
- Time zone: UTC+1 (CET)
  - Summer (DST): UTC+2 (CEST)
- Vehicle registration: NEL

Sołtmany [sɔu̯tˈmanɨ] is a village in the administrative district of Gmina Prostki, within Ełk County, Warmian-Masurian Voivodeship, in north-eastern Poland.

Sołtmany was established by 1553.
