= Lipińskie Małe =

- Village
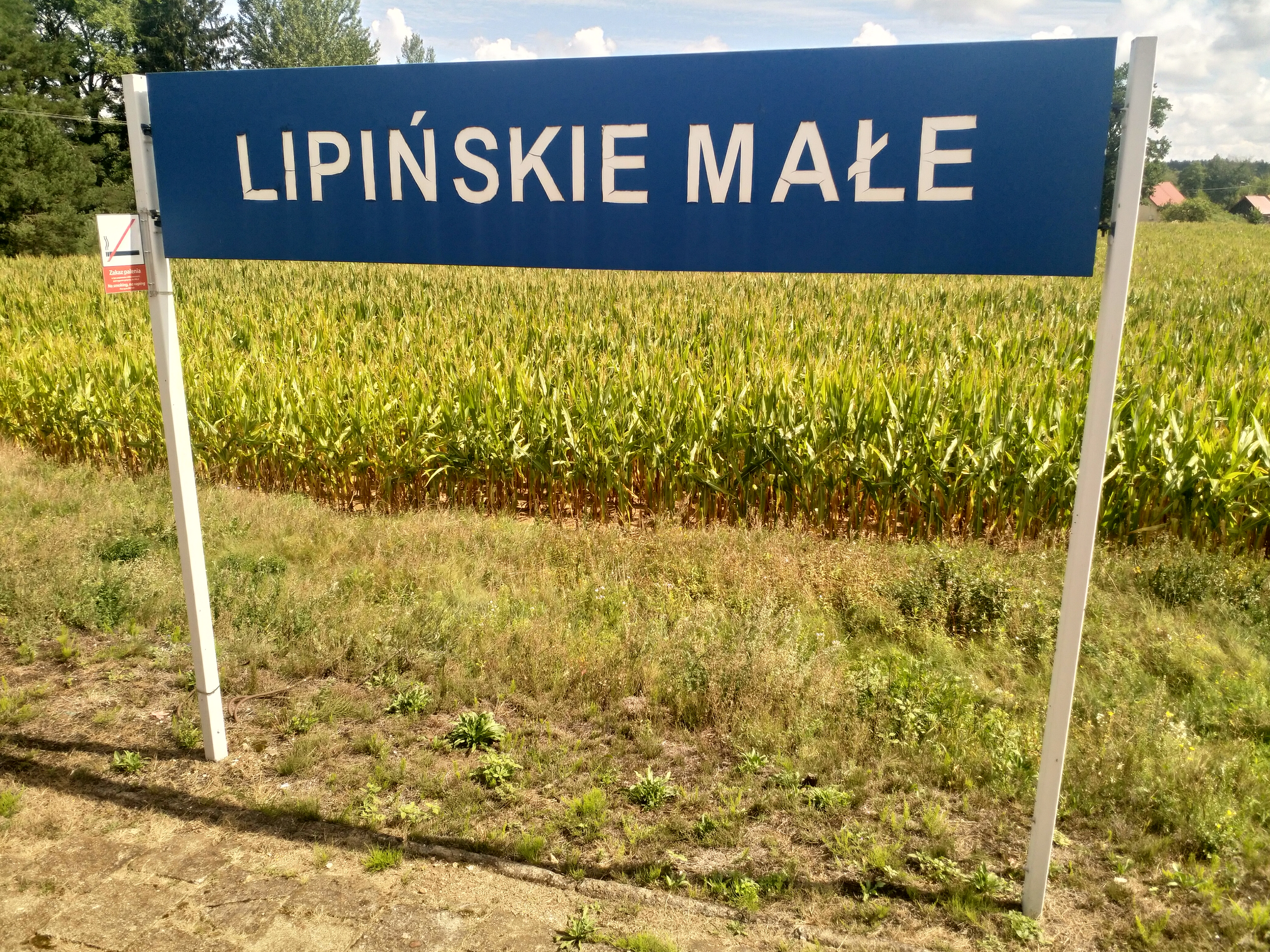
- Lipińskie Małe train stop

- Location within Poland
- Coordinates: 53°44′N 22°23′E
- Country: Poland
- Voivodeship: Warmian-Masurian
- County: Ełk
- Gmina: Prostki

Population
  - Total: 152
- Time zone: UTC+1 (CET)
  - Summer (DST): UTC+2 (CEST)
- Vehicle registration: NEL

Lipińskie Małe [liˈpiɲskʲɛ ˈmawɛ] is a village in the administrative district of Gmina Prostki, within Ełk County, Warmian-Masurian Voivodeship, in north-eastern Poland.
