= Nowaki, Warmian-Masurian Voivodeship =

Nowaki
- Village
- Location within Poland
- Coordinates: 53°43′N 22°17′E
- Country: Poland
- Voivodeship: Warmian-Masurian
- County: Ełk
- Gmina: Prostki

Nowaki [nɔˈvaki] is a village in the administrative district of Gmina Prostki, within Ełk County, Warmian-Masurian Voivodeship, in northern Poland.
