= W. S. Lach-Szyrma =

Wladislaw Somerville Lach-Szyrma
- Born: 25 December 1841; Devonport, Devon
- Died: 25 June 1915 (aged 73); Barkingside, Essex
- Education: Brasenose College, Oxford
- Occupations: Curate, writer
- Relatives: Krystyn Lach Szyrma (father)
- Writing career
- Language: English
- Period: Victorian era
- Genres: Science fiction History
- Subjects: History of Cornwall; English folklore
- Notable work: Aleriel, or A Voyage to Other Worlds (1883)
- Movement: Victorian literature

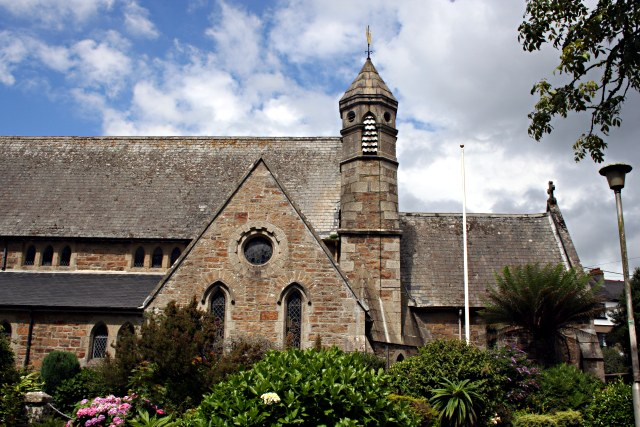
St Peter's Church, where Lach-Szyrma served as vicar from 1873 until 1890. The church opened in 1866.

The Reverend Wladislaw Somerville Lach-Szyrma, M.A., F.R.H.S. (25 December 1841 – 25 June 1915) was a British curate, historian and science fiction writer. He is credited as one of the first science fiction writers to use the word "Martian" as a noun.

== Personal life ==
Wladislaw Somerville Lach-Szyrma was the son of Krystyn Lach-Szyrma (1790–1866) and Sarah Frances Somerville (1802–1869). Krystyn was a Polish professor of philosophy who fled Poland c. 1830 to escape persecution amidst the November Uprising. He abandoned his teaching position at the University of Warsaw and started a new life in England, where he married Sarah Somerville of Plymouth. Their son Wladislaw was born on 25 December 1841 in the nearby town of Devonport - at that time Devonport and Plymouth were two separate and independent towns. Wladislaw's younger brother, Stanislaw Stuart Lach-Szyrma (18 February 1844 – 19 June 1844), died in infancy. Wladislaw married twice. His second wife, Rosina Atkinson (1846–1929), bore thirteen children.

After studying the classics in a Literae Humaniores course at Brasenose College, Oxford, Wladislaw accepted a curacy in Pensilva; so began a life of service to the Church of England in Cornwall. In 1869 he took the curacy at St Paul's in Truro, followed in 1871 by another in Carnmenellis. He became ill during a visit to Paris; after a short recovery, he returned to England to find that several newspapers had published his obituary. For example, the following appeared in the Exeter paper The Western Times on 30 January 1871:

Death of the Rev. W. G. Lach-Szyrma.—This gentleman, son of the late Col. Lach-Szyrma, a Pole, was born at Devonport. He was well known in this county, and also in Cornwall, having been for some time curate at St. Pauls, Truro. He was a young man of great talent and promise, and his untimely death at the age of 29 is a great loss. He was a high churchman, but he always spoke kindly of dissenters, and especially regarded Wesley and his works with great interest and favour. He often preached in the open air, and made a great impression upon the Moormen while residing at Prince Town, Dartmoor.

From 1873 until 1890 he served as vicar of St. Peter's Church in the port town of Newlyn, taking a sabbatical in Liverpool) in 1886. Wladislaw Lach-Szyrma was keenly interested in the history of Cornwall. He wrote prolifically about the churches and antiquities there—especially those of the district around Penzance. He was also a pioneering writer of science fiction. His 1883 novel, Aleriel, or A Voyage to Other Worlds, was one of the first works to use the word Martian as a noun. He also played rugby for Penzance.

He died in Barkingside, Essex on 25 June 1915.

== Selected publications ==
=== Non-fiction ===
- 1864: On the Relation of the Slavonians to the Other Indo-European Nations.
- 1878: A short history of Penzance, S. Michael's Mount, S. Ives, and the Land's End district. Truro: Lake and Lake.
- 1882: "M. Sebillot's System as applied to Cornish Folk-lore". Transactions of the Penzance Natural History and Antiquarian Society. New Series: pp. 132–150.
- 1884: Newlyn: Its History and Legends. Penzance: Oakmagic, 2001 (Originally published as: Newlyn & its Pier. Penzance: W. S. Lach-Szyrma, 1884).
- 1889: Relics of the Cornish Language. Penzance (with W. C. Borlase and S. Rundle) (reissued [Dumfries?]: Oakmagic, 2008 ISBN 1-904330-97-5 )
- 1891: A Church History of Cornwall and of the Diocese of Truro. London: Elliot Stock
- Curious Churches in Cornwall.

=== Science fiction ===
- 1883: Aleriel, or A Voyage to Other Worlds. London: Wyman and Sons (reissued London: British Library, 2011. ISBN 9781241364243)
- 1892: Under Other Conditions: A Tale. (reissued London: British Library, 2011. ISBN 9781241584627)

== See also ==
- Victorian literature
