= Cimoszki =

- Village
- Location within Poland
- Coordinates: 53°58′48″N 22°40′32″E
- Country: Poland
- Voivodeship: Warmian-Masurian
- County: Olecko
- Gmina: Wieliczki

Cimoszki [t͡ɕiˈmɔʂki] is a village in the administrative district of Gmina Wieliczki, within Olecko County, Warmian-Masurian Voivodeship, in northern Poland.
