= Aleriel, or A Voyage to Other Worlds =

1883 novel by W. S. Lach-Szyrma

- Book cover
- Author: W. S. Lach-Szyrma
- Language: English
- Genre: Science fiction
- Publisher: Wyman and Sons, Jurassic London
- Publication date: 1883
- Publication place: England
- Media type: Print
- Pages: 220
- OCLC: 7261871

Aleriel, or A Voyage to Other Worlds is an 1883 science fiction novel by Wladislaw Somerville Lach-Szyrma, a Polish-English curate, author, and historian.

The book is an expanded version of Lach-Szyrma's earlier work A Voice from Another World, published in 1874. A sequel series, "Letters from the Planets", was published in nine parts between 1887 and 1893 in Cassell's Family Magazine.

Published in 1883, Aleriel is a Victorian novel, which was previously thought to be the first published work to apply the word Martian as a noun (it is now known that the word had been so used as early as 1869). After the protagonist, Aleriel, lands on Mars, he buries his spacecraft in snow, "so that it might not be disturbed by any Martian who might come across it". The novel portrays Venus and Mars as utopias, Jupiter and Saturn as primitive, and the Moon as desolate.

A new edition was published in 2015. It includes the same text and a new introduction by Richard Dunn (Royal Museums Greenwich) and Marek Kukula (Royal Observatory Greenwich).

== See also ==
- List of science fiction novels
