= Krzyżewko =

- Village
- Location within Poland
- Coordinates: 54°2′39″N 22°37′24″E
- Country: Poland
- Voivodeship: Warmian-Masurian
- County: Olecko
- Gmina: Wieliczki
- Population: 20

Krzyżewko [kʂɨˈʐɛfkɔ] is a village in the administrative district of Gmina Wieliczki, within Olecko County, Warmian-Masurian Voivodeship, in northern Poland.
