= Olszewo, Gmina Prostki =

Olszewo
- Village
- Location within Poland
- Coordinates: 53°41′55″N 22°14′18″E
- Country: Poland
- Voivodeship: Warmian-Masurian
- County: Ełk
- Gmina: Prostki

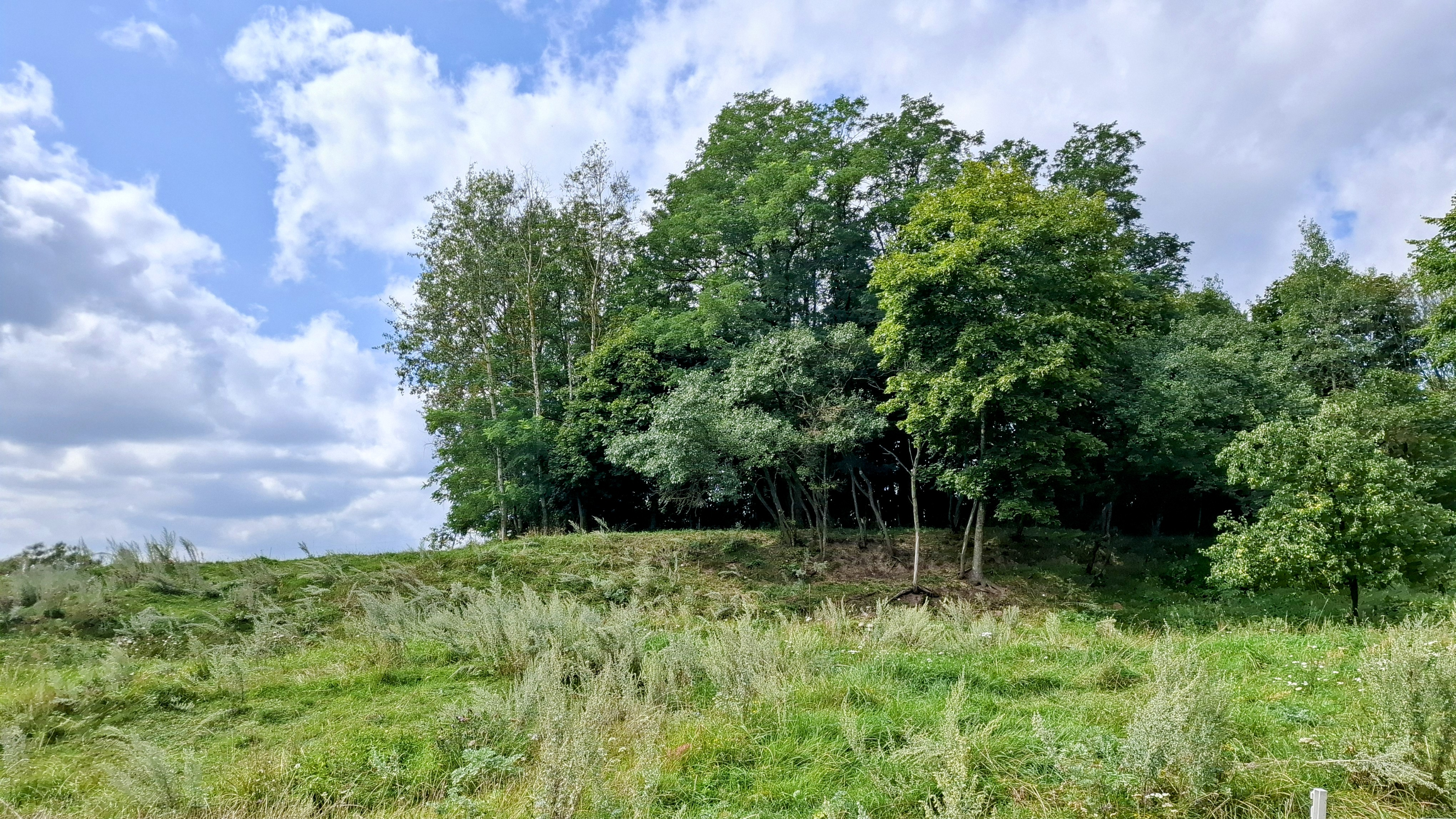
On a hill next to the village is the old German cemetery

Olszewo [ɔlˈʂɛvɔ] is a village in the administrative district of Gmina Prostki, within Ełk County, Warmian-Masurian Voivodeship, in northern Poland.
