= Dybówko =

- Village
- Location within Poland
- Coordinates: 53°40′06″N 22°18′15″E
- Country: Poland
- Voivodeship: Warmian-Masurian
- County: Ełk
- Gmina: Prostki

Dybówko [dɨˈbufkɔ] is a village in the administrative district of Gmina Prostki, within Ełk County, Warmian-Masurian Voivodeship, in northern Poland.
