= Ciernie, Gmina Prostki =

Ciernie
- Village
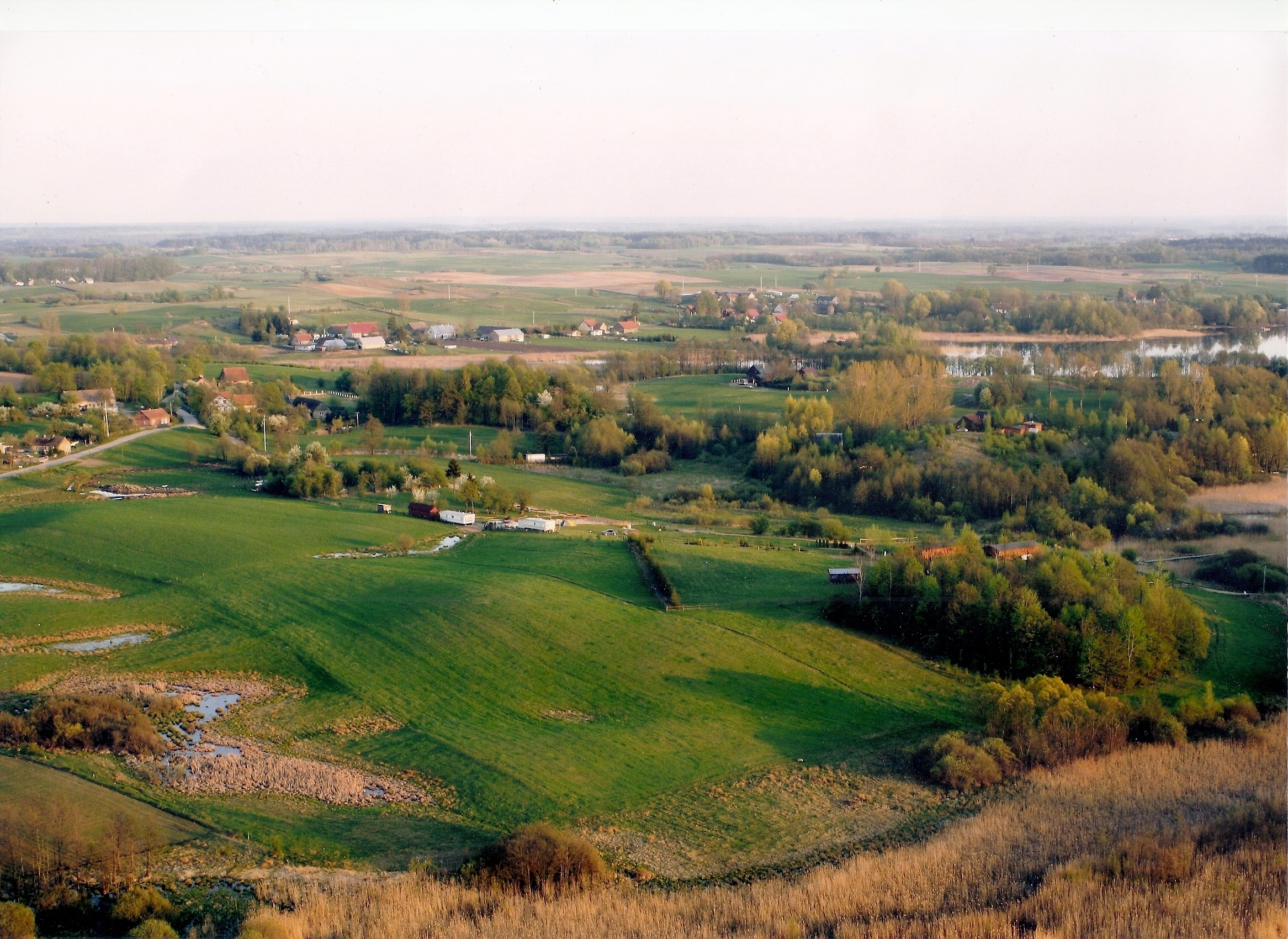

- Location within Poland
- Coordinates: 53°40′47″N 22°17′8″E
- Country: Poland
- Voivodeship: Warmian-Masurian
- County: Ełk
- Gmina: Prostki
- Time zone: UTC+1 (CET)
  - Summer (DST): UTC+2 (CEST)
- Vehicle registration: NEL

Ciernie [ˈt͡ɕɛrɲɛ] is a village in the administrative district of Gmina Prostki, within Ełk County, Warmian-Masurian Voivodeship, in northern Poland.
