= Guty, Olecko County =

Guty
- Village
- Location within Poland
- Coordinates: 53°54′N 22°34′E
- Country: Poland
- Voivodeship: Warmian-Masurian
- County: Olecko
- Gmina: Wieliczki
- Population: 50

Guty [ˈɡutɨ] is a village in the administrative district of Gmina Wieliczki, within Olecko County, Warmian-Masurian Voivodeship, in northern Poland.
