= Miłusze =

- Village
- Location within Poland
- Coordinates: 53°43′N 22°22′E
- Country: Poland
- Voivodeship: Warmian-Masurian
- County: Ełk
- Gmina: Prostki
- Time zone: UTC+1 (CET)
  - Summer (DST): UTC+2 (CEST)
- Vehicle registration: NEL

Miłusze [miˈwuʂɛ] is a village in the administrative district of Gmina Prostki, within Ełk County, Warmian-Masurian Voivodeship, in north-eastern Poland. It is located in Masuria.

== History ==
The village surely existed by 1546. Historically, the village was also known in Polish as Milusze and Milusy. In 1856, it had a population of 202.
