= Wieliczki =

- Village
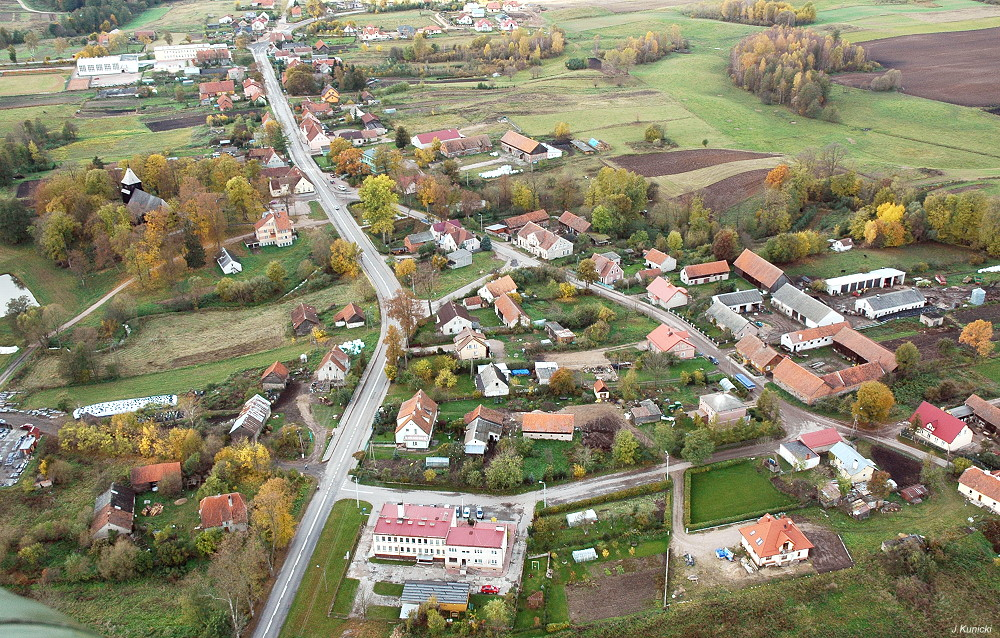
- Aerial view of Wieliczki

- Location within Poland
- Coordinates: 53°59′N 22°35′E
- Country: Poland
- Voivodeship: Warmian-Masurian
- County: Olecko
- Gmina: Wieliczki

Population
  - Total: 730
- Time zone: UTC+1 (CET)
  - Summer (DST): UTC+2 (CEST)
- Vehicle registration: NOE

Wieliczki [vjɛˈlit͡ʂki] is a village in Olecko County, Warmian-Masurian Voivodeship, in north-eastern Poland. It is the seat of the gmina (administrative district) called Gmina Wieliczki. It is located in the region of Masuria.
