= Bzury, Warmian-Masurian Voivodeship =

Bzury
- Village
- Location within Poland
- Coordinates: 53°41′35″N 22°13′1″E
- Country: Poland
- Voivodeship: Warmian-Masurian
- County: Ełk
- Gmina: Prostki

Bzury [ˈbzurɨ] is a village in the administrative district of Gmina Prostki, within Ełk County, Warmian-Masurian Voivodeship, in northern Poland.
