= Ostrykół =

- Village
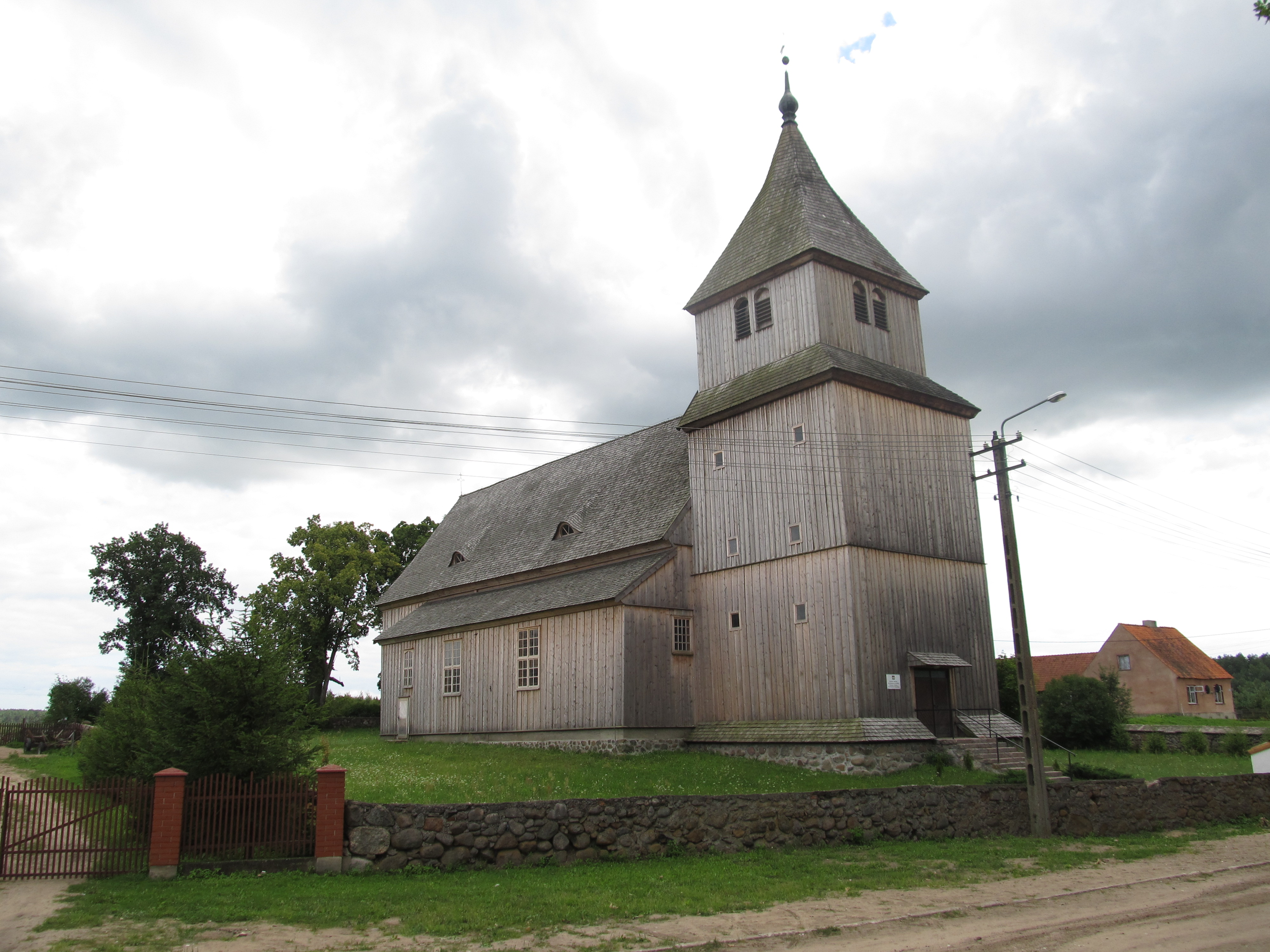
- Exaltation of the Holy Cross church in Ostrykół

- Location within Poland
- Coordinates: 53°44′N 22°26′E
- Country: Poland
- Voivodeship: Warmian-Masurian
- County: Ełk
- Gmina: Prostki

Population
  - Total: 220
- Time zone: UTC+1 (CET)
  - Summer (DST): UTC+2 (CEST)
- Vehicle registration: NEL

Ostrykół (Polish pronunciation: [ɔsˈtrɨkuw]) is a village in the administrative district of Gmina Prostki, within Ełk County, Warmian-Masurian Voivodeship, in north-eastern Poland. It is situated on the Ełk River in the region of Masuria.

== History ==
The local parish was founded in 1538. As of 1600, the population was exclusively Polish by ethnicity. The area was devastated after the Battle of Prostki in 1656. In 1794, Polish troops were in the village during the Kościuszko Uprising.

In the late 19th century, the village had a population of 420, Polish by ethnicity and Lutheran by confession.

Six Polish citizens were murdered by Nazi Germany in the village during World War II.
