= Katarzynowo, Warmian-Masurian Voivodeship =

Katarzynowo
- Village
- Location within Poland
- Coordinates: 53°44′34″N 22°33′49″E
- Country: Poland
- Voivodeship: Warmian-Masurian
- County: Ełk
- Gmina: Prostki

Katarzynowo [kataʐɨˈnɔvɔ] is a village in the administrative district of Gmina Prostki, within Ełk County, Warmian-Masurian Voivodeship, in northern Poland.
