= Żelazki, Warmian-Masurian Voivodeship =

Żelazki
- Village
- Location within Poland
- Coordinates: 53°45′N 22°27′E
- Country: Poland
- Voivodeship: Warmian-Masurian
- County: Ełk
- Gmina: Prostki

Żelazki [ʐɛˈlaski] is a village in the administrative district of Gmina Prostki, within Ełk County, Warmian-Masurian Voivodeship, in northern Poland.
