= Cimochy, Warmian-Masurian Voivodeship =

Cimochy
- Village
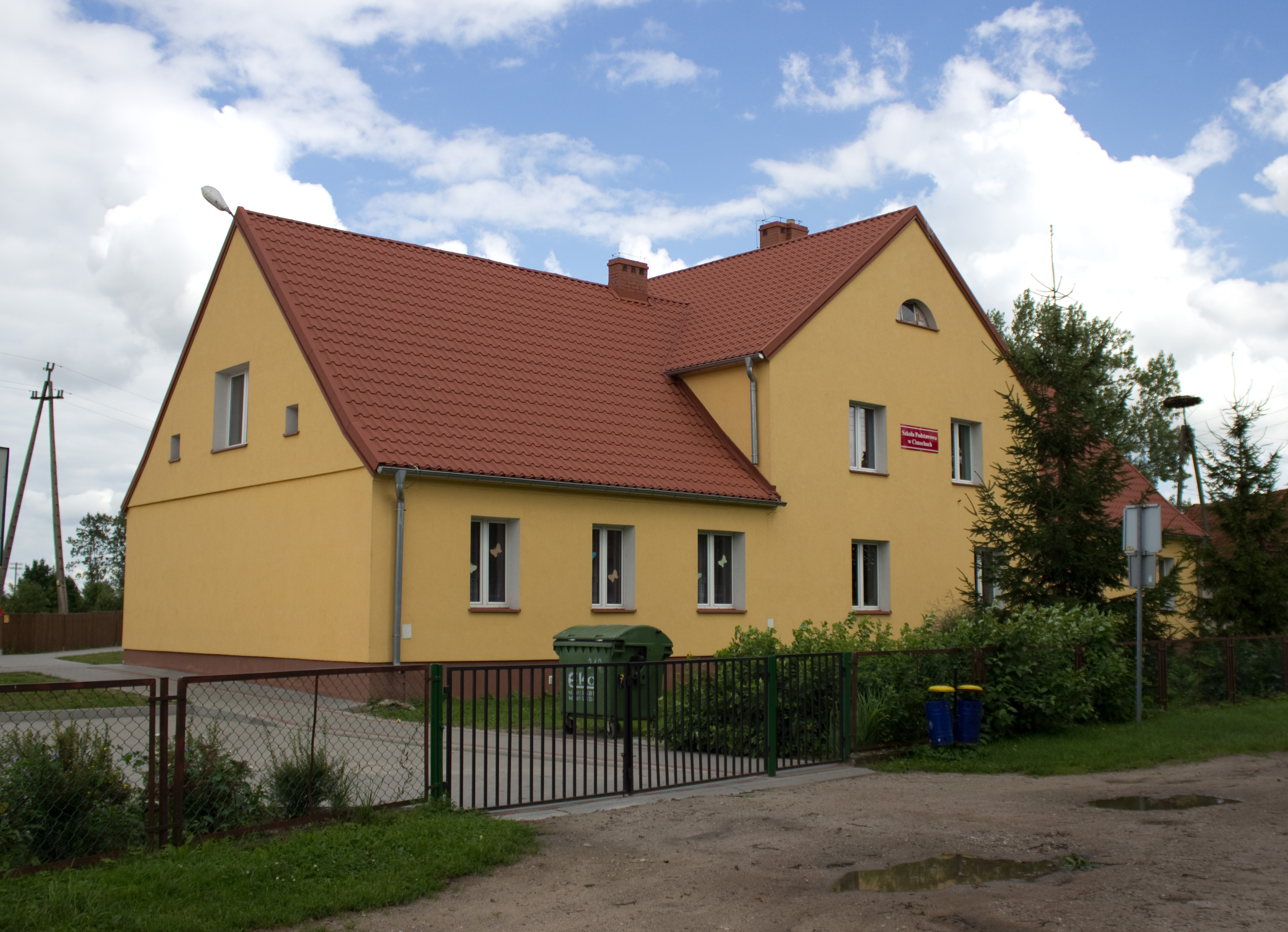
- Primary school in Cimochy

- Location within Poland
- Coordinates: 53°58′N 22°41′E
- Country: Poland
- Voivodeship: Warmian-Masurian
- County: Olecko
- Gmina: Wieliczki

Population
  - Total: 456
- Time zone: UTC+1 (CET)
  - Summer (DST): UTC+2 (CEST)
- Vehicle registration: NOE

Cimochy [t͡ɕiˈmɔxɨ] is a village in the administrative district of Gmina Wieliczki, within Olecko County, Warmian-Masurian Voivodeship, in north-eastern Poland. It is located in the historic region of Masuria.

== History ==
Historically, the village was known in Polish as both Cimochy and Czymochy. As of 1600, the population of the village was exclusively Polish.

During World War II, the Polish resistance carried out acts of sabotage against Nazi Germany. In 1944, the Polish Home Army twice damaged a sawmill that produced timber for the German Army, and mined railroad tracks, causing a freight train to derail.

== Notable residents ==
- Arno von Lenski (1893–1986), German general
