= Gąsiorówko =

- Village
- Location within Poland
- Coordinates: 53°54′57″N 22°31′37″E
- Country: Poland
- Voivodeship: Warmian-Masurian
- County: Olecko
- Gmina: Wieliczki
- Population: 180

Gąsiorówko [ɡɔ̃ɕɔˈrufkɔ] is a village in the administrative district of Gmina Wieliczki, within Olecko County, Warmian-Masurian Voivodeship, in northern Poland.
