= Arno von Lenski =

German military officer (1893–1986)

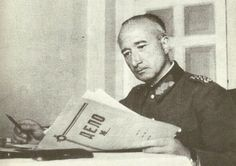
- Born: 20 July 1893; Czymochen, Province of East Prussia, German Empire
- Died: 4 October 1986 (aged 93); Eichwalde, East Germany
- Military career
- Allegiance: German Empire; Weimar Republic; Nazi Germany; East Germany
- Branch: Imperial German Army; Reichswehr; German Army; Kasernierte Volkspolizei; Nationale Volksarmee (NVA)
- Service years: 1912–1943; 1952–1958
- Rank: Generalleutnant (Wehrmacht); Generalmajor (NVA)
- Commands: 24th Panzer Division
- Conflicts: World War I World War II

Arno Ernst Max von Lenski (20 July 1893 – 4 October 1986) was a German military officer and general who served in the Imperial German army, the Wehrmacht of Nazi Germany, and after the war in the National People's Army of the German Democratic Republic, where he was also a politician.

== Early career ==
Lenski was born in the East Prussian village of Czymochen to a landowning family; his mother was a teacher of Masurian descent. Starting in 1903 he was educated at the Cadet School Köslin, Farther Pomerania and the Hauptkadettenanstalt Lichterfelde (Berlin) in 1908. In 1912 Lenski joined the German Imperial Army and was promoted to a Fähnrich in the Grenadierregiment zu Pferde Nr. 3 (Mounted Grenadier Regiment No. 3) in Bromberg on 22 March 1912.

Lenski fought in World War I, initially as a platoon leader, and joined the staff of the Generalkommando z.b.V. 55 in 1915. After the end of the war Lenski served in the Weimar German Reichswehr and served in the Kavallerieregiment 6 in Demmin and Pasewalk and at the Cavalry School Hanover, where he was a subordinate of Wilhelm Keitel in 1921. In 1925 he became a teacher at the cavalry school and in 1929, now a Rittmeister, commanding officer of the 5. Squadron of the Reiterregiment 14 at Ludwigslust.

== Nazi Germany ==
In 1933 he was promoted to a Major and became the commander of the NCO riding school and adjutant of the Cavalry School commander at Hanover. In 1935 Lenski became the commander of the Kavallerieregiment 6 in Schwedt/Oder, which was transferred to Darmstadt in 1937. Promoted to an Oberst in 1938, Lenski commanded a reconnaissance unit at the Western Front in 1939 and became the commander of the "School for Mobile Troops" in Krampnitz near Potsdam on 1 December 1939.

On 29 August 1940 Lenski was appointed as an assessor at the Volksgerichtshof in Berlin by Adolf Hitler. He was involved in at least eight trials, including a death sentence, as an assessor of Roland Freisler.

In September 1942 Lenski took over the command of the 24 Panzer Division, which fought near Stalingrad, and was promoted to a lieutenant general on 1 January 1943. After the defeat of Wehrmacht forces in the Battle of Stalingrad Lenski became a prisoner of war in the Soviet Union.

== Soviet captivity ==
Lenski was first imprisoned at Krasnogorsk and transferred to Suzdal in April 1943. After initial hesitation he joined the National Committee for a Free Germany and the Bund Deutscher Offiziere led by Walther von Seydlitz-Kurzbach on 7 May 1944. Lenski was released on 17 August 1949 and moved to the Soviet Occupation Zone of Germany.

== German Democratic Republic ==
After the foundation of the German Democratic Republic Lenski was formally acknowledged as a "Victim of Fascism" in October 1949 and became a member of the council of the National Democratic Party of East Germany (NDPD) in May 1950. Between March 1951 and July 1952 Lenski worked at the municipal administration of Berlin. Starting on 1 August 1952 he joined the staff of the East German paramilitary Kasernierte Volkspolizei (Barracked People's Police) and was responsible for the configuration of tank troops. On 28 April 1953 he was promoted to Commander of Tank Troops (Chef der Panzertruppen) at the "Department of National Defence" at Strausberg and became a major general of the National People's Army after its foundation.

Beginning in 1954 Lenski was observed by the East German Secret Police (Stasi). In December 1957 the Socialist Unity Party of Germany decided to release Lenski from duty in the National People's Army and Lenski retired on 31 July 1958.

In 1952 Lenski became a member of the East German Parliament for the NDPD. After his retirement he joined several equestrian associations and was a member of the East German Olympic Committee and the executive board of the Society for German-Soviet Friendship and the East German Gymnastics and Sports Association. Lenski was the President of the equestrian sports society, and the equestrian board of the paramilitary Gesellschaft für Sport und Technik. In 1964, he succeeded Otto Korfes as chairman of the Association of Former Officers.

Lenski died on 4 October 1986 and was buried at Strausberg.
