= Krupin, Olecko County =

Krupin
- Village
- Location within Poland
- Coordinates: 54°2′N 22°34′E
- Country: Poland
- Voivodeship: Warmian-Masurian
- County: Olecko
- Gmina: Wieliczki
- Founded: 1561
- Time zone: UTC+1 (CET)
  - Summer (DST): UTC+2 (CEST)
- Vehicle registration: NOE

Krupin [ˈkrupin] is a village in the administrative district of Gmina Wieliczki, within Olecko County, Warmian-Masurian Voivodeship, in north-eastern Poland. It is located in the historic region of Masuria.

== History ==
The origins of the village date back to 1561, when brothers Paweł and Stańko Markowicz from nearby Niedźwiedzkie bought land to establish a village. Initially it was named Markowice after the founders. For centuries, it remained an ethnically Polish village, and as of 1600, it had an exclusively Polish population.
