= Popowo, Warmian-Masurian Voivodeship =

Popowo
- Village
- Location within Poland
- Coordinates: 53°40′56″N 22°23′37″E
- Country: Poland
- Voivodeship: Warmian-Masurian
- County: Ełk
- Gmina: Prostki
- Population: 83

Popowo ([pɔˈpɔvɔ]; German: Popowen, 1938–1945 Wittingen) is a village in the administrative district of Gmina Prostki, within Ełk County, Warmian-Masurian Voivodeship, in northern Poland.
