= Długochorzele =

- Village
- Location within Poland
- Coordinates: 53°42′N 22°22′E
- Country: Poland
- Voivodeship: Warmian-Masurian
- County: Ełk
- Gmina: Prostki

Długochorzele [dwuɡɔxɔˈʐɛlɛ] is a village in the administrative district of Gmina Prostki, within Ełk County, Warmian-Masurian Voivodeship, in northern Poland.
