= Zawady-Tworki =

- Village
- Location within Poland
- Coordinates: 53°44′5″N 22°36′27″E
- Country: Poland
- Voivodeship: Warmian-Masurian
- County: Ełk
- Gmina: Prostki
- Population: 140

Zawady-Tworki [zaˈvadɨ ˈtfɔrki] is a village in the administrative district of Gmina Prostki, within Ełk County, Warmian-Masurian Voivodeship, in northern Poland.
