= Bartki, Olecko County =

Bartki
- Settlement
- Location within Poland
- Coordinates: 53°56′07″N 22°31′54″E
- Country: Poland
- Voivodeship: Warmian-Masurian
- County: Olecko
- Gmina: Wieliczki

Bartki [ˈbartki] is a settlement in the administrative district of Gmina Wieliczki, within Olecko County, Warmian-Masurian Voivodeship, in northern Poland.
