= Starosty =

- Village
- Location within Poland
- Coordinates: 53°58′N 22°34′E
- Country: Poland
- Voivodeship: Warmian-Masurian
- County: Olecko
- Gmina: Wieliczki

Starosty [staˈrɔstɨ] is a village in the administrative district of Gmina Wieliczki, within Olecko County, Warmian-Masurian Voivodeship, in northern Poland.
