= Cisy, Warmian-Masurian Voivodeship =

Cisy
- Village
- Location within Poland
- Coordinates: 53°45′56″N 22°34′34″E
- Country: Poland
- Voivodeship: Warmian-Masurian
- County: Ełk
- Gmina: Prostki

Cisy [ˈt͡ɕisɨ] is a village in the administrative district of Gmina Prostki, within Ełk County, Warmian-Masurian Voivodeship, in northern Poland.
