= Kibisy =

- Village
- Location within Poland
- Coordinates: 53°40′46″N 22°18′50″E
- Country: Poland
- Voivodeship: Warmian-Masurian
- County: Ełk
- Gmina: Prostki

Kibisy [kiˈbisɨ] is a village in the administrative district of Gmina Prostki, within Ełk County, Warmian-Masurian Voivodeship, in northern Poland.
