= Bobry, Gmina Prostki =

Bobry
- Village
- Location within Poland
- Coordinates: 53°44′4″N 22°20′59″E
- Country: Poland
- Voivodeship: Warmian-Masurian
- County: Ełk
- Gmina: Prostki
- Population (approx.): 600

Bobry [ˈbɔbrɨ] is a village in the administrative district of Gmina Prostki, within Ełk County, Warmian-Masurian Voivodeship, in northern Poland.
