= Jelitki =

- Village
- Location within Poland
- Coordinates: 53°55′N 22°33′E
- Country: Poland
- Voivodeship: Warmian-Masurian
- County: Olecko
- Gmina: Wieliczki

Jelitki [jɛˈlitki] is a village in the administrative district of Gmina Wieliczki, within Olecko County, Warmian-Masurian Voivodeship, in northern Poland.

From 1975 to 1998, the village belonged to Suwałki County in Poland before being a part of Olecko County.
