= Wiśniowo Ełckie =

- Village
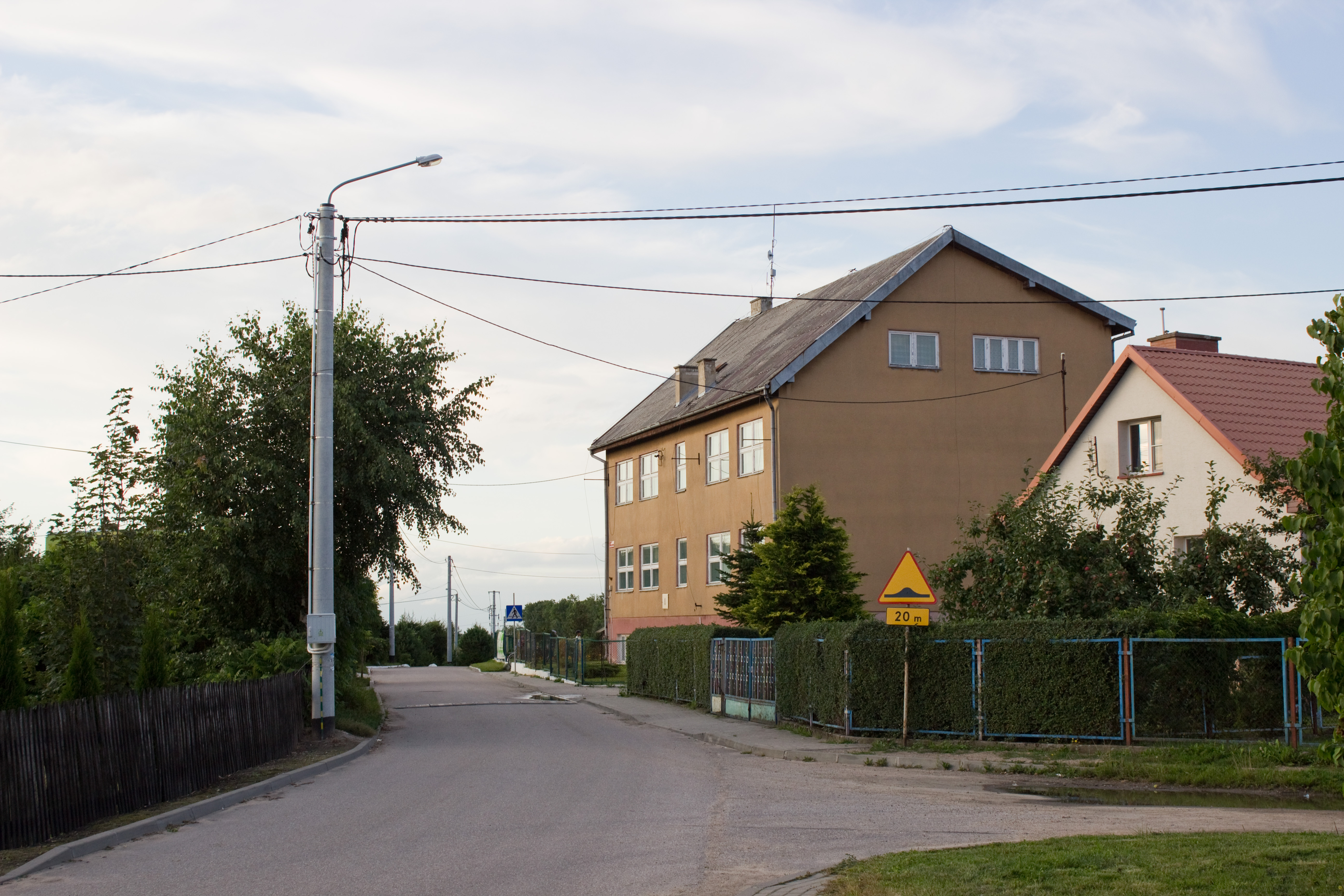

- Location within Poland
- Coordinates: 53°45′20″N 22°31′35″E
- Country: Poland
- Voivodeship: Warmian-Masurian
- County: Ełk
- Gmina: Prostki
- Founded: 1486
- Population: 890
- Time zone: UTC+1 (CET)
  - Summer (DST): UTC+2 (CEST)
- Vehicle registration: NEL

Wiśniowo Ełckie [viɕˈɲɔvɔ ˈɛu̯t͡skʲɛ] is a village in the administrative district of Gmina Prostki, within Ełk County, Warmian-Masurian Voivodeship, in northern Poland. It is located in the historic region of Masuria.

== History ==
The origins of the village date back to 1486, when Gotard Korbowski was granted 66 włókas of land to establish a village. As of 1600, the population was solely Polish.

Under Nazi Germany, the village was renamed Kölmersdorf to erase traces of Polish origin, and was the location of two labour camps of the Reich Labour Service. Following World War II, in 1945, the village became again part of Poland, and its historic Polish name was restored with the addition of the adjective Ełckie after the nearby county seat of Ełk to distinguish it from other villages of the same name.
