= Krzywińskie, Ełk County =

Krzywińskie
- Village
- Location within Poland
- Coordinates: 53°44′N 22°15′E
- Country: Poland
- Voivodeship: Warmian-Masurian
- County: Ełk
- Gmina: Prostki

Krzywińskie [kʂɨˈviɲskʲɛ] is a village in the administrative district of Gmina Prostki, within Ełk County, Warmian-Masurian Voivodeship, in northern Poland.
