= Gąsiorowo, Olecko County =

Gąsiorowo
- Village
- Location within Poland
- Coordinates: 53°53′55.2″N 22°31′19.9″E
- Country: Poland
- Voivodeship: Warmian-Masurian
- County: Olecko
- Gmina: Wieliczki

Gąsiorowo [ɡɔ̃ɕɔˈrɔvɔ] is a village in the administrative district of Gmina Wieliczki, within Olecko County, Warmian-Masurian Voivodeship, in northern Poland.
