= Kobylinek, Warmian-Masurian Voivodeship =

Kobylinek
- Village
- Location within Poland
- Coordinates: 53°41′10″N 22°22′14″E
- Country: Poland
- Voivodeship: Warmian-Masurian
- County: Ełk
- Gmina: Prostki
- Population: 90

Kobylinek [kɔbɨˈlinɛk] is a village in the administrative district of Gmina Prostki, within Ełk County, Warmian-Masurian Voivodeship, in northern Poland.
