= Rynie =

- Village
- Location within Poland
- Coordinates: 54°1′19″N 22°39′16″E
- Country: Poland
- Voivodeship: Warmian-Masurian
- County: Olecko
- Gmina: Wieliczki

Rynie [ˈrɨɲɛ] is a village in the administrative district of Gmina Wieliczki, within Olecko County, Warmian-Masurian Voivodeship, in northern Poland.
