= Krupin, Ełk County =

Krupin
- Village
- Location within Poland
- Coordinates: 53°41′48″N 22°24′39″E
- Country: Poland
- Voivodeship: Warmian-Masurian
- County: Ełk
- Gmina: Prostki
- Time zone: UTC+1 (CET)
  - Summer (DST): UTC+2 (CEST)
- Vehicle registration: NEL

Krupin [ˈkrupin] is a village in the administrative district of Gmina Prostki, within Ełk County, Warmian-Masurian Voivodeship, in north-eastern Poland. It is located in the historic region of Masuria.

== History ==
Since its establishment, Krupin was an ethnically Polish village. It surely existed by 1553. Various Polish nobility lived there, including the Ciesielski, Wilkowski and Dulski families.
