= Wojnasy =

- Village
- Location within Poland
- Coordinates: 54°00′41″N 22°39′57″E
- Country: Poland
- Voivodeship: Warmian-Masurian
- County: Olecko
- Gmina: Wieliczki

Wojnasy [vɔi̯ˈnasɨ] is a village in the administrative district of Gmina Wieliczki, within Olecko County, Warmian-Masurian Voivodeship, in northern Poland.

== Tourism and Recreation ==
The surrounding Masuria region is popular for outdoor activities such as sailing, kayaking, cycling, hiking, and fishing due to its extensive lakes and forests
