= Małe Olecko =

- Village
- Location within Poland
- Coordinates: 53°58′22″N 22°32′25″E
- Country: Poland
- Voivodeship: Warmian-Masurian
- County: Olecko
- Gmina: Wieliczki
- Founded: 1541
- Founder: Bartosz Leśnicki
- Time zone: UTC+1 (CET)
  - Summer (DST): UTC+2 (CEST)
- Vehicle registration: NOE

Małe Olecko [ˈmawɛ ɔˈlɛt͡skɔ] is a village in the administrative district of Gmina Wieliczki, within Olecko County, Warmian-Masurian Voivodeship, in north-eastern Poland. It is situated on the southern shore of Olecko Małe Lake in Masuria.

== History ==
Małe Olecko was founded in 1541 by Bartosz Leśnicki from Mazovia, who bought land to establish a village. In 1867, it had a population of 535, 93.8% Polish. In 1938, during a massive campaign of renaming of placenames, the government of Nazi Germany renamed it to Herzogshöhe in attempt to erase traces of Polish origin. In 1939, it had a population of 518. Following Germany's defeat in World War II, in 1945, the village became again part of Poland and its historic name was restored.
