= Gmina Wieliczki =

Gmina Wieliczki Wieliczki Commune
- Gmina
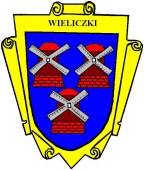
- Coat of arms
- Interactive map of Gmina Wieliczki
- Coordinates (Wieliczki): 53°59′N 22°35′E
- Country: Poland
- Voivodeship: Warmian-Masurian
- County: Olecko
- Seat: Wieliczki

Area
  - Total: 141 km^{2} (54 sq mi)

Population (2006)
  - Total: 3,420
  - Density: 24.3/km^{2} (62.8/sq mi)

Gmina Wieliczki is a rural gmina (administrative district) in Olecko County, Warmian-Masurian Voivodeship, in northern Poland. Its seat is the village of Wieliczki, which lies approximately 8 kilometres (5 mi) south-east of Olecko and 139 km (86 mi) east of the regional capital Olsztyn.

The gmina covers an area of 141 square kilometres (54.4 sq mi), and as of 2006 its total population is 3,420.

== Villages ==
Gmina Wieliczki contains the villages and settlements of Bartki, Bartkowski Dwór, Cimochy, Cimoszki, Gąsiorówko, Gąsiorowo, Godziejewo, Guty, Jelitki, Kleszczewo, Krupin, Krzyżewko, Małe Olecko, Markowskie, Niedźwiedzkie, Nory, Nowe Raczki, Nowy Młyn, Puchówka, Rynie, Sobole, Starosty, Szeszki, Urbanki, Wieliczki, Wilkasy and Wojnasy.

== Neighbouring gminas ==
Gmina Wieliczki is bordered by the gminas of Bakałarzewo, Kalinowo, Olecko and Raczki.
