= Prostki =

- Village
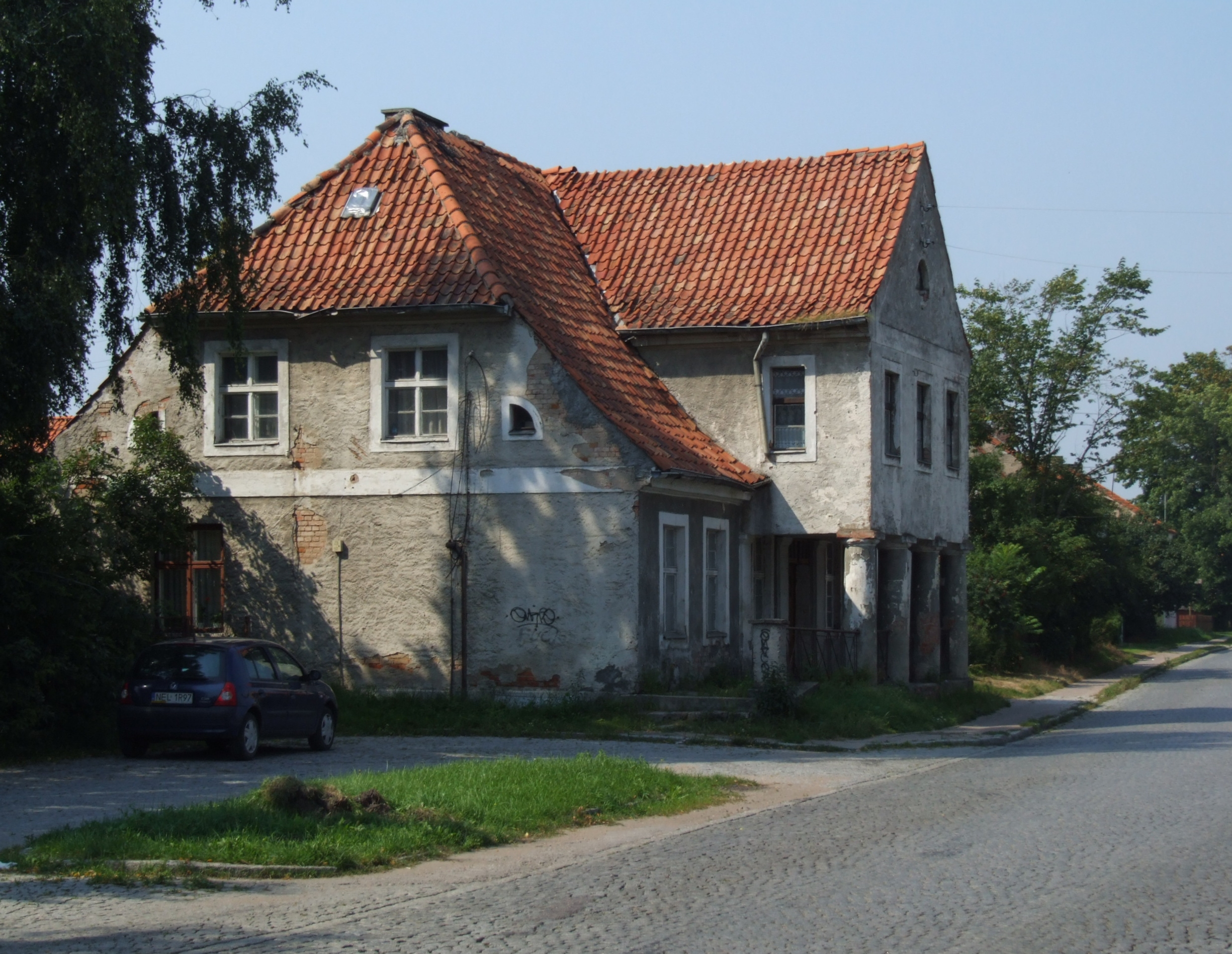
- Former restaurant Gasthaus „Karl Krüger” on the former border between Germany and Poland

- Location within Poland
- Coordinates: 53°41′56″N 22°25′58″E
- Country: Poland
- Voivodeship: Warmian-Masurian
- County: Ełk
- Gmina: Prostki

Population
  - Total: 3,000
- Time zone: UTC+1 (CET)
  - Summer (DST): UTC+2 (CEST)
- Postal code: 19-335
- Vehicle registration: NEL
- Website: https://web.archive.org/web/20131022153322/http://gok.prostki.info/

Prostki [ˈprɔstki] is a village in Ełk County, Warmian-Masurian Voivodeship, in north-eastern Poland. It is the seat of the gmina (administrative district) called Gmina Prostki. It is situated on the Ełk River, in the historic region of Masuria.

== History ==
In 1656 the Battle of Prostki was fought nearby, during which Polish forces commanded by Wincenty Korwin Gosiewski defeated the combined Swedish-Brandenburgian forces.

In the late 19th century, the village had an almost exclusively Polish population of 1,300. The populace was mostly employed in agriculture, while 150 people worked in reloading trains.

Under Nazi Germany, two labour camps of the Reich Labour Service were operated in the village. 130 Polish citizens were murdered by Nazi Germany in the village during World War II. The Germans subjected Poles, French and Italians to forced labour in the village.

== Sports ==
The local football club is Pojezierze Prostki. It competes in the lower leagues.

== Notable residents ==
- Ernst Meyer (1887–1930), German politician
- Michał Słoma (born 1982), Polish rower
