= Różyńsk Wielki =

- Village
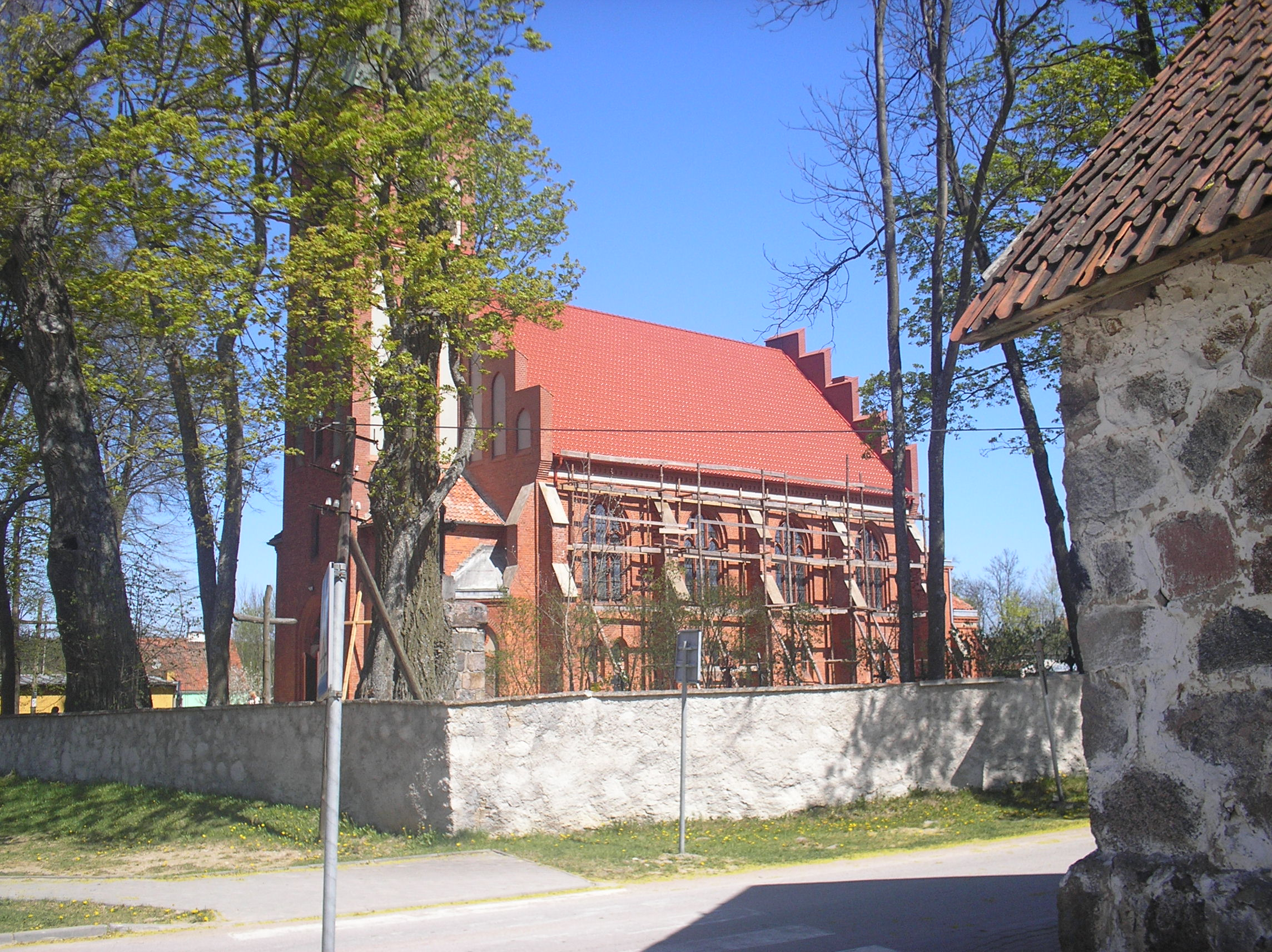
- Church of Saint Stephen

- Location within Poland
- Coordinates: 53°40′35″N 22°14′23″E
- Country: Poland
- Voivodeship: Warmian-Masurian
- County: Ełk
- Gmina: Prostki

Różyńsk Wielki (Polish pronunciation: [ˈruʐɨj̃sk ˈfjɛlkʲi]) is a village in the administrative district of Gmina Prostki, within Ełk County, Warmian-Masurian Voivodeship, in northern Poland.
