= Bartkowski Dwór =

- Settlement
- Location within Poland
- Coordinates: 53°55′28″N 22°31′58″E
- Country: Poland
- Voivodeship: Warmian-Masurian
- County: Olecko
- Gmina: Wieliczki

Bartkowski Dwór [bartˈkɔfski ˈdvur] is a settlement in the administrative district of Gmina Wieliczki, within Olecko County, Warmian-Masurian Voivodeship, in northern Poland.
