= Dybowo, Ełk County =

Dybowo
- Village
- Location within Poland
- Coordinates: 53°40′27″N 22°17′12″E
- Country: Poland
- Voivodeship: Warmian-Masurian
- County: Ełk
- Gmina: Prostki
- Population: 110

Dybowo [dɨˈbɔvɔ] is a village in the administrative district of Gmina Prostki, within Ełk County, Warmian-Masurian Voivodeship, in northern Poland.
