= Krupin (surname) =

Krupin (masculine, Russian: Крупин) or Krupina (feminine, Russian: Крупина) is a Russian surname. Notable people with the surname include:

- Janet Krupin (born 1987), American actress, producer, singer, and writer
- Vladimir Krupin (born 1941), Russian writer
