= Gmina Prostki =

Gmina Prostki Prostki Commune
- Gmina
- Coat of arms
- Interactive map of Gmina Prostki
- Coordinates (Prostki): 53°41′56″N 22°25′58″E
- Country: Poland
- Voivodeship: Warmian-Masurian
- County: Ełk
- Seat: Prostki

Area
  - Total: 230.47 km^{2} (88.98 sq mi)

Population (2011)
  - Total: 7,556
  - Density: 32.79/km^{2} (84.91/sq mi)
- Website: http://www.prostki.pl

Gmina Prostki is a rural gmina (administrative district) in Ełk County, Warmian-Masurian Voivodeship, in northern Poland. Its seat is the village of Prostki, which lies approximately 15 kilometres (9 mi) south of Ełk and 128 km (80 mi) east of the regional capital Olsztyn.

The gmina covers an area of 230.47 square kilometres (89.0 sq mi), and as of 2006 its total population is 7,439 (7,556 in 2011).

== Villages ==
Gmina Prostki contains the villages and settlements of Bobry, Bogusze, Borki, Bzury, Ciernie, Cisy, Czyprki, Dąbrowskie, Długochorzele, Długosze, Dybówko, Dybowo, Glinki, Gorczyce, Guty Rożyńskie, Jebramki, Katarzynowo, Kibisy, Kobylin, Kobylinek, Kopijki, Kosinowo, Krupin, Krzywe, Krzywińskie, Kurczątki, Lipińskie Małe, Marchewki, Miechowo, Miłusze, Niedźwiedzkie, Nowaki, Olszewo, Ostrykół, Popowo, Prostki, Różyńsk Wielki, Sokółki, Sołtmany, Taczki, Wiśniowo Ełckie, Wojtele, Zawady-Tworki and Żelazki.

== Neighbouring gminas ==
Gmina Prostki is bordered by the town of Grajewo and by the gminas of Biała Piska, Ełk, Grajewo, Kalinowo, Rajgród and Szczuczyn.
