= Niedźwiedzkie, Olecko County =

Niedźwiedzkie
- Village
- Location within Poland
- Coordinates: 53°58′51″N 22°35′7″E
- Country: Poland
- Voivodeship: Warmian-Masurian
- County: Olecko
- Gmina: Wieliczki
- Population: 270

Niedźwiedzkie [ɲɛd͡ʑˈvjɛt͡skʲɛ] is a village in the administrative district of Gmina Wieliczki, within Olecko County, Warmian-Masurian Voivodeship, in northern Poland.
